= List of senators of Réunion =

Location of Réunion in France

Following is a list of senators of Réunion, people who have represented the overseas department of Réunion in the Senate of France.

== Third Republic ==
Senators for Réunion under the French Third Republic were:

In Office	Name	Notes
1876–1882	Alexandre Robinet de La Serve	Died in office
1882–1890	Jean Milhet-Fontarabie	Died in office
1890–1904	Théodore Drouhet	Died in office
1905-1905	Louis Brunet	Died in office
1906–1918	Félix Crépin	Died in office
1920–1928	Jules Auber	Died in office
1928–1945	Léonus Bénard	

== Fourth Republic ==
Senators for Réunion under the French Fourth Republic were:

In office	Name	Notes
1946–1948	Adrien Barret	
1946–1948	Fernand Colardeau	
1948–1955	Jules Olivier	
1948–1955	Marcel Vauthier	
1955–1958	Marcel Cerneau	
1955–1959	Georges Repiquet	

== Fifth Republic ==
The department of Réunion was represented by two senators from 1959, three from 1983 and four from 2011. Senators for Réunion under the French Fifth Republic were:

In office	Name	Party or Group	Notes
1959–1983	Georges Repiquet	Union for the New Republic (UNR) then Rally for the Republic (RPR)	
1959–1974	Paul-Alfred Isautier	Independent Republicans (RI)	
1974–1992	Louis Virapoullé	Union for French Democracy (UDF) / Centrist Union of Democrats for Progress (UCDP)	
1983–1992	Albert Ramassamy	Socialist Party (PS)	
1983–1987	Paul Bénard	Rally for the Republic (RPR)	Died in office
1987–1995	Paul Moreau	Rally for the Republic (RPR)	Replaced Paul Bénard; died in office
1995–2001	Edmond Lauret	Rally for the Republic (RPR)	Replaced Paul Moreau
1992–1998	Pierre Lagourgue	Centrist Union group (UC)	Died in office
1998–2001	Lylian Payet	Miscellaneous left (DVG)	Replaced Pierre Lagourgue
1992–1996	Éric Boyer	Rally for the Republic (RPR)	Moved to the Constitutional Council
1996–2004	Paul Vergès	Communist Party of Réunion (PCR)	Replaced Éric Boyer. Elected European deputy in 2004
2005–2011	Gélita Hoarau	Communist Party of Réunion (PCR)	Replaced Paul Vergès
2001–2011	Anne-Marie Payet	Centrist Union group (UC)	
2001–2011	Jean-Paul Virapoullé	Union for a Popular Movement (UMP)	
2011–2014	Jacqueline Farreyrol	Union for a Popular Movement (UMP)	Resigned in 2014
from 2014	Didier Robert	Union for a Popular Movement (UMP)	Replaced Jacqueline Farreyrol
from 2011	Michel Vergoz	Socialist Party (PS)	
from 2011	Michel Fontaine	Union for a Popular Movement (UMP)	
2011–2016	Paul Vergès	Communist Party of Réunion (PCR)	Died in office
from 2016	Gélita Hoarau	Communist Party of Réunion (PCR)	Replaced Paul Vergès

== Sources ==
- Liste des anciens sénateurs de la IIIème République par circonscription (in French), Sénat de France
- Liste des anciens sénateurs de la IVème République par circonscription (in French), Sénat de France
- Liste des anciens sénateurs de la Vème République par circonscription (in French), Sénat de France
- Liste par département – Réunion (in French), Sénat de France
