= Alliance of the Overseas =

The Alliance of the Overseas (French: Alliances des Outre-Mers) was a French electoral coalition for the 2009 European elections in the Overseas constituency composed of left-wing overseas parties. The list was supported by the Left Front.

The list was composed of the Communist Party of Réunion (PCR), the Martinican Democratic Rally (RDM), the Guianese Socialist Party (PSG), and the Kanak and Socialist National Liberation Front (FLNKS) of New Caledonia.

It was widely seen as the successor to a similar alliance which topped the poll in the constituency in 2004, and on which Paul Vergès was elected MEP.

== Leaders ==
- Overseas: Élie Hoarau (Indian Ocean Section)

The list received 21.01% of the vote, and Hoarau was elected MEP.
