= Demographics of Réunion =

This article concerns the demography of Réunion. People of Réunion are Réunionese. The official language is French, and Réunionese Creole is widely spoken. The population of Réunion is 966,129 as of 2021.

== Population ==
Historical population
Year	Pop.	±% p.a.
1950	248,000	—
1960	335,000	+3.05%
1970	462,000	+3.27%
1980	510,000	+0.99%
1990	612,000	+1.84%
2000	739,000	+1.90%
2010	846,000	+1.36%
2019	866,500	+0.27%
Source: 2019 data

Year	Population	Year	Population	Year	Population
1671	90	1830	101 300	1961	349 282
1696	269	1848	110 300	1967	416 525
1704	734	1849	120 900	1974	476 675
1713	1 171	1860	200 000	1982	515 814
1717	2 000	1870	212 000	1990	597 823
1724	12 550	1887	163 881	1999	706 300
1764	25 000	1897	173 192	2006	781 962
1777	35 100	1926	182 637	2007	790 500
1789	61 300	1946	241 708	2008	802 001
1826	87 100	1954	274 370		
Official data from INSEE by census or estimate; estimates shown in italics.

As of 2021, estimates put the population of Réunion at 966,129, with a growth rate of 1.63%. The birth rate was estimated at 21.84 births per 1,000 population, and the death rate at 5.55 deaths per 1,000 population in the same year. The net migration rate was zero in 2000. The following table describes age structure and sex ratios in Réunion.

Age structure and sex ratio
Age band (years)	Percentage population	Sex ratio (male/female)
At birth	n/a	1.05
0-14	32	1.05
15-64	62	0.97
65+	6	0.68

=== Structure of the population ===
Structure of the population (01.01.2010) (Provisional estimates):

Age group	Male	Female	Total	%
Total	399 728	428 326	828 054	100
0-4	35 044	33 093	68 137	8,23
5-9	36 404	34 819	71 223	8,60
10-14	36 292	34 535	70 827	8,55
15-19	35 775	35 479	71 254	8,60
20-24	28 067	28 265	56 332	6,80
25-29	22 922	27 618	50 540	6,10
30-34	24 936	30 303	55 239	6,67
35-39	28 029	32 557	60 586	7,32
40-44	32 311	35 469	67 780	8,19
45-49	30 352	31 939	62 291	7,52
50-54	24 261	25 699	49 960	6,03
55-59	20 577	21 820	42 397	5,12
60-64	15 588	15 727	31 315	3,78
65-69	11 380	12 867	24 247	2,93
70-74	7 912	10 529	18 441	2,23
75-79	5 036	7 513	12 549	1,52
80-84	2 948	5 295	8 243	1,00
85-89	1 438	3 203	4 641	0,56
90-94	350	1 173	1 523	0,18
95+	106	423	529	0,06
Age group	Male	Female	Total	Percent
0-14	107 740	102 446	210 187	25,38
15-64	262 818	284 877	547 695	66,14
65+	29 170	41 003	70 173	8,47

Population by Sex and Age Group (Census 01.I.2015):

Age group	Male	Female	Total	%
Total	411 435	439 292	850 727	100
0–4	31 643	30 377	62 021	7.29
5–9	35 386	33 428	68 814	8.09
10–14	36 713	34 716	71 429	8.40
15–19	34 756	33 223	67 979	7.99
20–24	27 392	27 312	54 703	6.43
25–29	24 326	27 969	52 295	6.15
30–34	23 815	28 564	52 379	6.16
35–39	25 787	30 236	56 023	6.59
40–44	28 755	31 855	60 610	7.12
45–49	31 471	33 945	65 416	7.69
50–54	29 842	31 017	60 858	7.15
55–59	24 330	26 221	50 551	5.94
60–64	19 874	21 043	40 918	4.81
65-69	14 070	15 448	29 519	3.47
70-74	9 895	11 794	21 688	2.55
75-79	6 870	9 521	16 390	1.93
80-84	3 920	6 283	10 203	1.20
85-89	1 762	3 919	5 681	0.67
90-94	662	1 843	2 505	0.29
95-99	120	441	560	0.07
100+	47	137	183	0.02
Age group	Male	Female	Total	Percent
0–14	103 742	98 521	202 263	23.78
15–64	270 347	291 385	561 732	66.03
65+	37 346	49 386	86 732	10.20

Population Estimates by Sex and Age Group (01.VII.2020):

Age group	Male	Female	Total	%
Total	406 983	449 875	856 858	100
0–4	29 077	28 944	58 021	6.77
5–9	32 392	32 182	64 574	7.54
10–14	34 645	33 742	68 387	7.98
15–19	33 493	32 392	65 885	7.69
20–24	24 181	24 747	48 928	5.71
25–29	22 409	26 263	48 672	5.68
30–34	22 818	28 736	51 554	6.02
35–39	24 095	29 971	54 066	6.31
40–44	25 024	30 174	55 198	6.44
45–49	27 567	30 947	58 514	6.83
50–54	31 127	33 487	64 614	7.54
55–59	29 200	30 863	60 063	7.01
60–64	22 867	25 358	48 225	5.63
65-69	18 590	20 655	39 245	4.58
70-74	12 445	14 673	27 118	3.16
75-79	8 537	10 883	19 420	2.27
80-84	4 983	8 239	13 222	1.54
85-89	2 358	4 468	6 826	0.80
90-94	943	2 227	3 170	0.37
95-99	203	734	937	0.11
100+	29	190	219	0.03
Age group	Male	Female	Total	Percent
0–14	96 114	94 868	190 982	22.29
15–64	262 781	292 938	555 719	64.86
65+	48 088	62 069	110 157	12.86

== Vital statistics ==
	Average population (x 1000)	Live births	Deaths	Natural change	Crude birth rate (per 1000)	Crude death rate (per 1000)	Natural change (per 1000)	Total fertility rate
1950	248	11 714	5 570	6 144	48.0	22.8	25.2	
1951	259	11 684	4 653	7 031	46.5	18.5	28.0	
1952	268	13 231	4 677	8 554	51.3	18.1	33.2	
1953	277	13 597	4 444	9 153	51.1	16.7	34.4	
1954	284	13 613	4 064	9 549	49.7	14.8	34.9	
1955	292	14 082	4 394	9 688	49.2	15.4	33.9	
1956	300	14 129	3 746	10 383	47.7	12.7	35.1	
1957	308	14 484	3 464	11 020	46.9	11.2	35.7	
1958	317	14 271	4 594	9 677	44.9	14.4	30.4	
1959	326	14 388	4 422	9 966	44.0	13.5	30.5	
1960	336	14 856	3 892	10 964	44.0	11.5	32.4	
1961	345	15 205	4 001	11 204	43.7	11.5	32.2	
1962	355	15 937	4 121	11 816	44.4	11.5	32.9	
1963	366	16 482	4 058	12 424	44.4	10.9	33.5	
1964	378	16 681	3 960	12 721	43.3	10.3	33.0	
1965	391	16 869	3 806	13 063	42.9	9.7	33.2	
1966	405	16 683	4 284	12 399	41.4	10.6	30.8	
1967	421	16 013	3 586	12 427	38.1	8.5	29.6	
1968	437	15 827	3 763	12 064	37.2	8.8	28.3	
1969	451	15 153	3 867	11 286	34.8	8.9	25.9	
1970	462	13 437	3 663	9 774	30.1	8.2	21.9	
1971	470	14 432	3 494	10 938	31.7	7.7	24.0	
1972	475	13 740	3 391	10 349	29.7	7.3	22.4	
1973	479	13 287	3 377	9 910	28.3	7.2	21.1	
1974	482	13 423	3 090	10 333	28.3	6.5	21.8	
1975	485	13 301	3 182	10 119	27.7	6.6	21.0	
1976	488	12 828	3 113	9 715	26.3	6.4	20.0	
1977	492	12 517	3 119	9 398	25.4	6.3	19.1	
1978	497	11 978	3 129	8 849	24.1	6.3	17.8	
1979	503	12 444	3 021	9 423	24.8	6.0	18.7	
1980	509	12 302	3 258	9 044	24.2	6.4	17.8	
1981	517	11 838	3 161	8 677	23.1	6.2	16.9	
1982	527	11 964	3 048	8 916	23.1	5.9	17.2	
1983	537	12 484	3 301	9 183	23.7	6.3	17.4	
1984	548	13 116	3 040	10 076	24.4	5.7	18.8	
1985	559	13 163	3 018	10 145	24.1	5.5	18.6	
1986	569	12 797	3 065	9 732	23.0	5.5	17.5	
1987	579	12 599	3 090	9 509	22.3	5.5	16.8	
1988	589	13 561	3 163	10 398	23.6	5.5	18.1	
1989	599	13 898	3 307	10 591	23.6	5.6	18.0	
1990	597.828	13 877	3 151	10 726	23.1	5.2	17.8	
1991	607.837	14 117	3 401	10 716	23.1	5.6	17.5	2.56
1992	620.333	14 240	3 347	10 893	22.8	5.4	17.4	2.55
1993	633.030	13 432	3 205	10 227	21.3	5.1	16.2	2.38
1994	645.093	13 327	3 089	10 238	20.7	4.8	15.9	2.33
1995	657.162	13 053	3 135	9 918	19.9	4.8	15.1	2.27
1996	668.915	13 047	3 565	9 482	19.5	5.3	14.2	2.25
1997	680.185	13 712	3 553	10 159	20.1	5.2	14.9	2.35
1998	692.184	13 538	3 731	9 807	19.5	5.4	14.2	2.31
1999	703.820	14 153	3 825	10 328	20.0	5.4	14.6	2.33
2000	716.314	14 594	3 836	10 758	20.2	5.3	14.9	2.51
2001	729.010	14 541	3 829	10 712	19.8	5.2	14.6	2.45
2002	740.207	14 789	4 004	10 785	19.8	5.4	14.4	2.41
2003	750.840	14 427	4 041	10 386	19.0	5.3	13.7	2.43
2004	761.630	14 545	3 958	10 587	18.9	5.1	13.8	2.45
2005	772.907	14 610	4 357	10 253	18.7	5.6	13.1	2.49
2006	781.962	14 495	4 323	10 172	18.4	5.5	12.9	2.44
2007	794.107	14 808	3 974	10 834	18.6	5.0	13.6	2.47
2008	808.250	14 927	4 115	10 812	18.4	5.1	13.4	2.47
2009	816.364	14 299	4 109	10 190	17.4	5.0	12.4	2.37
2010	821.136	14 147	4 220	9 927	17.0	5.1	11.9	2.36
2011	828.581	14 124	4 002	10 122	16.5	4.7	11.8	2.37
2012	833.944	14 288	4 167	10 121	16.5	4.8	11.7	2.43
2013	835.103	14 002	4 258	9 744	16.6	5.1	11.5	2.41
2014	842.767	14 095	4 355	9 740	16.8	5.2	11.6	2.44
2015	850.727	14 011	4 531	9 480	16.5	5.3	11.2	2.46
2016	852.924	13 742	4 685	9 053	16.1	5.5	10.6	2.43
2017	853.659	13 708	4 673	9 035	16.0	5.5	10.5	2.44
2018	855.961	13 364	5 011	8 353	15.6	5.8	9.8	2.39
2019	861.210	13 171	5 064	8 107	15.3	5.9	9.4	2.36
2020	863.083	13 142	5 154	7 988	15.2	5.9	9.3	2.36
2021	871.157	13 470	5 750	7 720	15.4	6.6	8.8	2.42
2022	881.348	13 205	6 390	6 815	14.9	7.2	7.5	2.37
2023	886.453	12 876	5 509	7 367	14.4	6.2	8.2	2.32
2024	892.102	11 818	5 832	5 986	13.1	6.5	6.6	2.12
2025	896.175	11 790			13.1	6.8	6.3	

=== Life expectancy ===
At birth, life expectancy is 76.5 years for male children, and 82.9 for female (figures for 2011).

== Ethnic groups ==
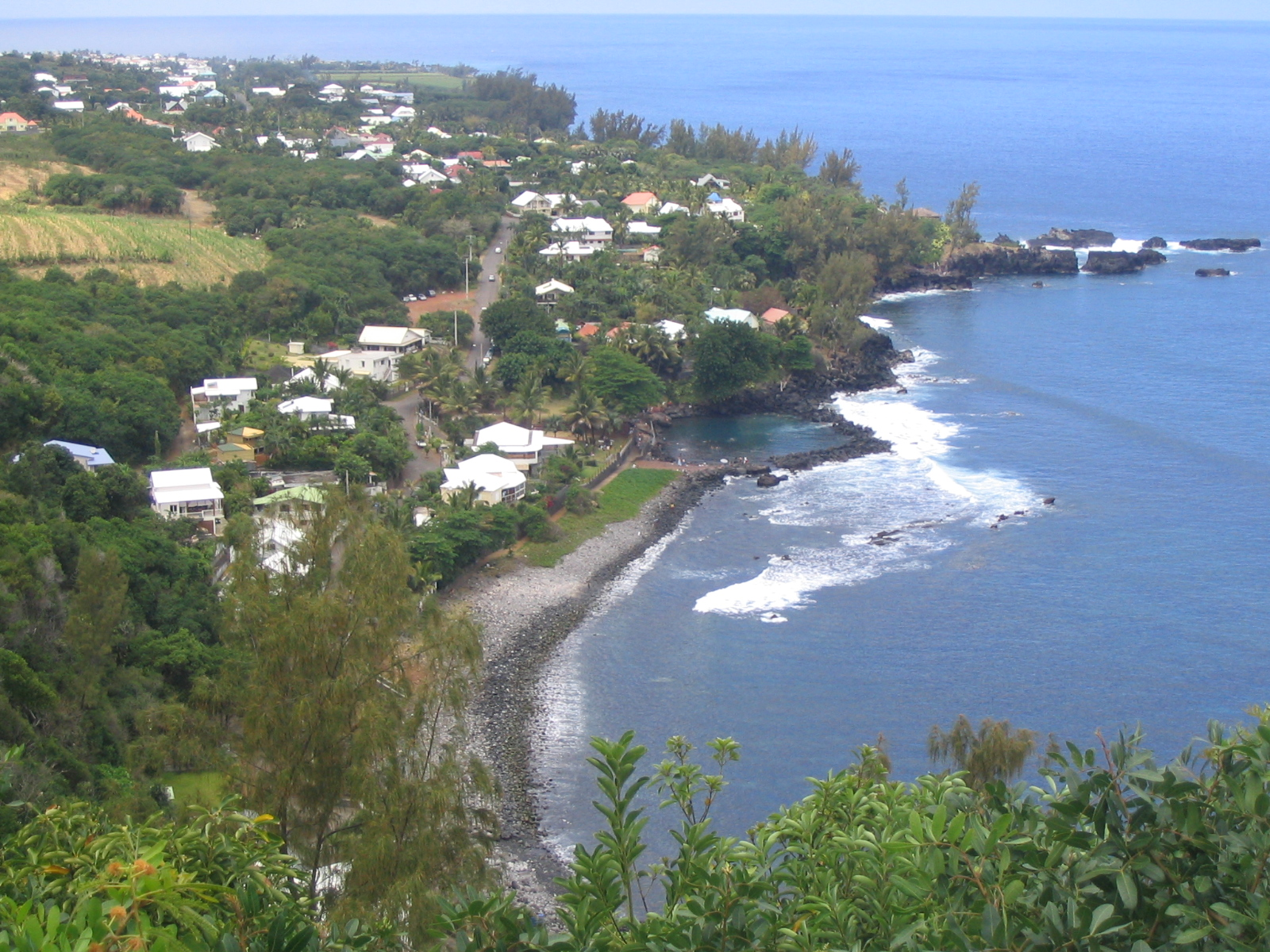
Manapany

Ethnic groups present include people of European, African, Malagasy, Indian and Chinese origin as well as many of mixed race. Local names for these are used: Yabs, Cafres, Malbars and Zarabes (both ethnic groups of Indian origin) and Chinois.

The proportion of people of each ethnicity is not known exactly, since the 1958 constitution bans questions about ethnicity in compulsory censuses in France. Long-established and ongoing intermarriage also blurs the issue. People of primarily African descent make up 35% of the population, those of primarily European and Indian descent number about one-quarter each, and people of Chinese, Malay, Vietnamese descent, along with those identifying as Métis, form roughly 15%.

People of Tamil origin make up the majority of the Indo-Réunionnais people about 12%-13% of the island's population; Gujarati, Bihari and other origins form the remainder of the population. The island's community of Muslims from modern region of Pakistan and North India and elsewhere is also commonly referred to as Zarabes.

Creoles (a name given to those born on the island, of various ethnic origins), make up the majority of the population. Groups that are not creole include people from Metropolitan France (known as Zoreilles) and those from Mayotte and the Comoros.

=== Genetics ===
In 2005, a genetic study on the racially mixed people of Réunion found the following. For maternal (mitochondrial) DNA, the haplogroups are Indian (44%), East Asian (27%), European/Middle Eastern (19%) or African (10%). The Indian lineages are M2, M6 and U2i, the East Asian ones are E1, D5a, M7c, and F (E1 and M7c also found only in South East Asia and in Madagascar), the European/Middle Eastern ones are U2e, T1, J, H, and I, and the African ones are L1b1, L2a1, L3b, and L3e1.

For paternal (Y-chromosome) DNA, the haplogroups are European/Middle Eastern (85%) or East Asian (15%). The European lineages are R1b and I, the Middle Eastern one E1b1b1c (formerly E3b3) (also found in Northeast Africa), and the East Asian ones are R1a (found in many parts of the world including Europe and Central and Southern Asia but the particular sequence has been found in Asia) and O3.

== Languages ==
French is the only official language of Reunion. Although not official, Réunion Creole is also commonly spoken by the majority of the population. One can hear it in any administration or office, but education is only in French.

Tamil is taught as optional language in some schools. Due to the diverse population, other languages such as Mandarin, Hakka and Cantonese are also spoken by members of the Chinese community, but fewer people speak these languages as younger generations start to converse in French. The number of speakers of Indian languages (mostly Urdu and Gujarati) is also dropping sharply. Arabic is taught in mosques and spoken by a small community of Arabs.

== Religion ==
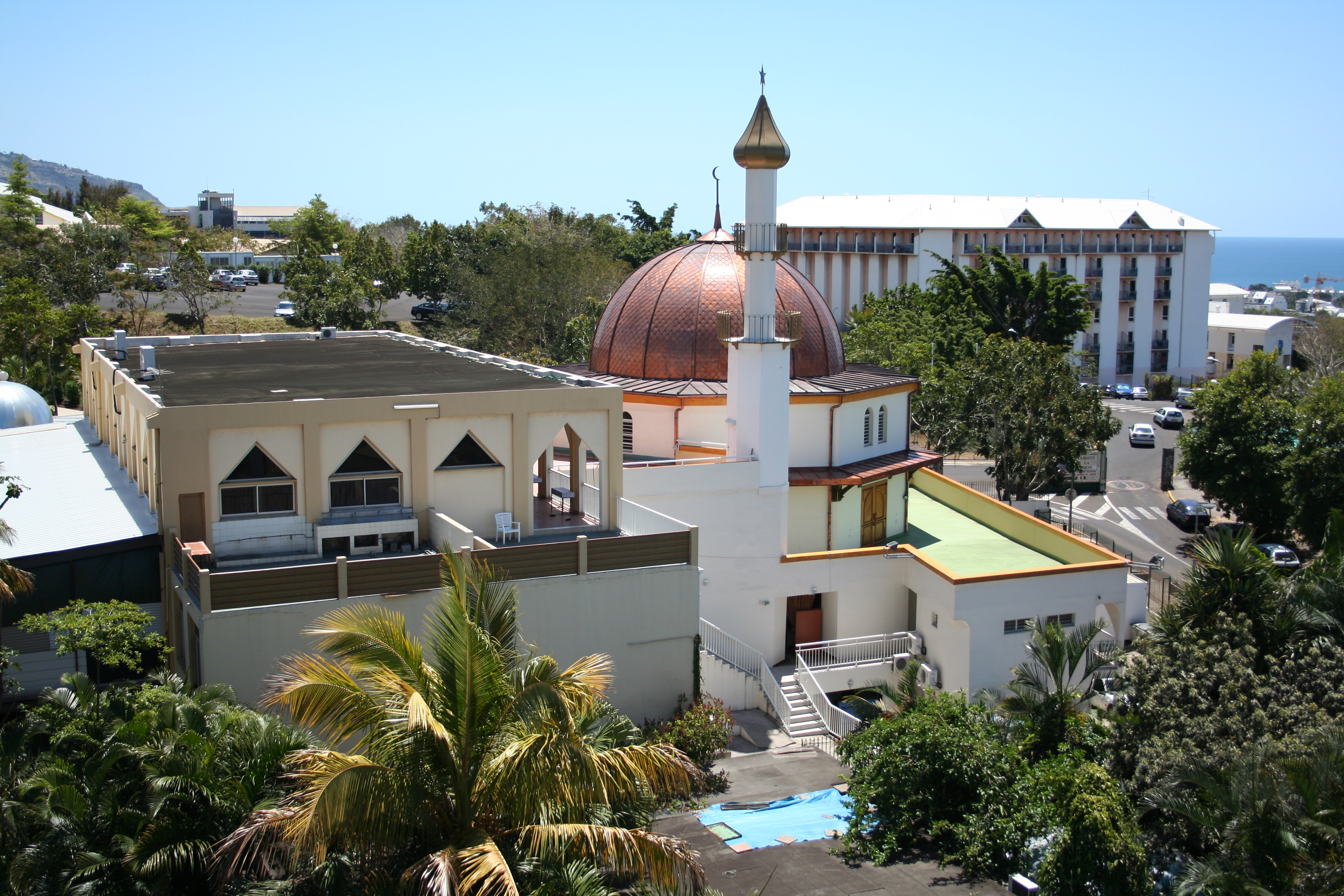
Moufia Mosque in Saint-Denis

The predominant religion is the Catholic branch of Christianity, with Hinduism, Islam and Buddhism also represented, among others.

== See also ==
- Demographics of France
