= Overseas Territories of France (European Parliament constituency) =

Former European Parliament constituency

Overseas Territories
- European Parliament constituency
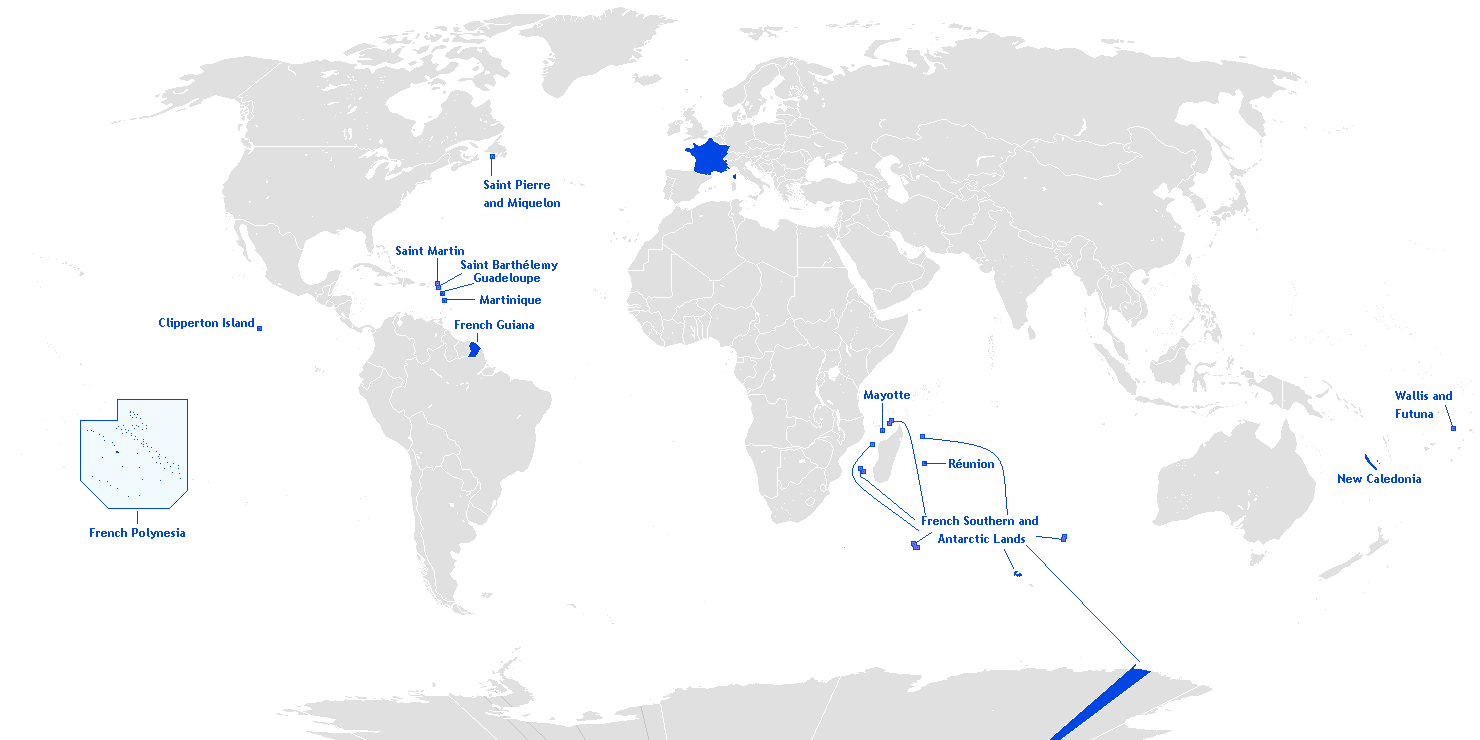
- Shown in blue
- Member state: France
- Created: 2004
- Dissolved: 2019
- MEPs: 3

Sources
- europarl.europa.eu

For elections in the European Union, Overseas Territories (French: Circonscription Outre-Mer) was a European Parliament constituency in France until the 2019 European Parliament election. It consisted of all the inhabited French overseas departments and collectivities (including the sui generis overseas territory of New Caledonia, but excluding the non-permanently inhabited overseas territories that have no registered voters), even if their territory is not part of the European Union. Constitutionally, all French citizens are also granted the same European citizenship, consequently all of them elected representatives in the European Parliament, independently of their area of residence.

In 2019, France decided to switch to a single constituency for EU elections, putting an end to all regional constituencies, including the Overseas Territory of France constituency.

The aim of the single constituency was to advance participation and electoral equality. Critics claimed that participation did not increase and that overseas territories became less represented.. The number of overseas MEPs was unchanged, however, at 3. Voter turnout increased to approximately 50% in 2019 and 52% in 2024.

== Members of the European Parliament ==
Election	MEP (party)	MEP (party)	MEP (party)
2004	Paul Vergès (PCR)	Jean-Claude Fruteau (PS)	Margie Sudre (UMP)
2007	Madeleine de Grandmaison (PCR)	Catherine Néris (PS)	Margie Sudre (UMP)
2009	Élie Hoarau (PCR)	Patrice Tirolien (PS)	Maurice Ponga (UMP)
2014	Younous Omarjee (PCR)	Louis-Joseph Manscour (PS)	Maurice Ponga (UMP)

== Composition ==
According to the provisions of Law No. 2007-224 of 21 February 2007:

The Overseas Territories electoral constituency consists of three sections. Each list in this constituency has at least one candidate per section. [A] decree ... shall allocate seats in the constituency between the three sections. The sections are described as follows:

1. Atlantic section: the three overseas departments of Guadeloupe, Guyane and Martinique, and the three overseas collectivities of Saint Barthélemy, Saint Martin and Saint Pierre and Miquelon;
2. Indian Ocean section: the two overseas departments of Mayotte and Réunion;
3. Pacific section: the two overseas collectivities of French Polynesia and Wallis and Futuna, and the special collectivity of New Caledonia which has two members.

Those eleven territories have different status with the European Union (none of them are part of the Schengen Area):

- The outermost regions (OMR) are part of the European Union. They include the five overseas departments of Guadeloupe, Guyane, Martinique, Mayotte and Réunion, and the overseas collectivity of Saint Martin.
- The overseas countries and territories (OCT) are not part of the European Union. They include the four overseas collectivities of Saint Barthélemy, Saint Pierre and Miquelon, French Polynesia and Wallis and Futuna, and the special collectivity of New Caledonia (the French Southern and Antarctic Territories and Clipperton Island do not vote for the European Parliament elections, as they have no permanent inhabitants).

The legal currency in those overseas territories is the Euro since 1999 (before then, it was the French franc), including in OCTs (by special agreement with the European Union) except those in the Pacific section which still use the CFP franc (bound to the Euro by a special agreement between France and the European Union, but with a revocable rate of 8.38 EUR for 1,000 XPF).

== Results ==
=== 2014 ===
European Election 2014: Overseas Territories
List	Candidates	Votes	Of total (%)	± from prev.
UMP	Maurice Ponga Yolaine Costes, Laurent Bernier, Sylviane Terooatea, Abdou Ahmad, Karine Mousseau, Yannick Manuofiua, Sandra Sinimale, Rémy Louis Budoc	76,168	26.70	
PS	Louis-Joseph Manscour Philippe Le Constant, Marie-Claude Tjibaou, Marlène Miroite-Melisse, Soilihi Ahamada Ousseni, Yolanie Horth, Tetuahau Temaru, Elisabeth Taofifenua-Sako, Yves Hoarau	55,214	19.36	
PCR	Younous Omarjee Maeva Salmon, Jean Crusol, Daourina Abdallah, Yves Quiquerez, Mylène Mazia, Gérard Reignier, Sesilia Liufau, Bruno Lorion	52,017	18.23	
FN	Marie-Luce Brasier-Clain, Marc Guille, Muriel Dauphin, René Tran Van Nghia, Yvette Arnaud, Stéphane Chipault, Faoulati Sandi, Joseph Grondin, Bianca Hénin	29,241	10.25	
MoDem	Léonard Sam, Audrey de Fondaumiere, Louis Molinie, Malia Tafili, Yanick Dindjian, Jacqueline Fourlin-Jougon, Gérard Mou-Tham, Afidati Mkadara, Jocelyn Varsovie	24,059	8.43	
EELV	Yvette Duchemann, José Gaillou, Jocelyne Hatchi, Ahamada Salime, Florencine Edouard, Christian Civilise, Danon Lutchmee Odayen, Jules Hauata, Janine Maurice-Bellay	19,167	6.72	
LO	Ghislaine Joachim-Arnaud, Jean-Marie Nomertin, Corinne Gasp, Jean-Luc Payet, Danielle Diakok, Jean-Yves Payet, Marie-Hellen Marthe-Dite-Surelly, Louis Maugee, Lita Dahomay	9,743	3.42	
DLF	Hugues Maillot, Valérie Dambreville, Norman Charles, Elisabeth Ducarouge, Pascal Pagand, Marie-Annick Mavande, William Felicite, Marie-Pierre Goy Martin, Jean-Jack Morel	4,749	1.66	
Regions and Peoples in Solidarity	Jean-Jacob Bicep, Kathy Carime-Jalime, Tony Grava, Véronique Joachim Pamphile, Moumini Oumara, Marie-Gérard Sona, Patrice Christian Langenier, Jeanne Marie Gertrude Docteur, Jean-Max Erapa	4,467	1.57	
UPR	Dominique Frut, Marie-Christine Clevy, Erwan Mutez, Valérie Jung, Philippe Hoareau, Lucie Millet, David Aappadoo, Sylvie Briant, Jacques Marteau	2,793	0.98	
Citizens' Europe	Patricia Pompilius, Simione Vakauliafa, Sanya Youssouf, Gérard Bons, Sylvie Baudoin, Laurent Cobo, Alberte Piquionne, Judes Boubou, Claude Frimat	1,912	0.67	
PP	Marie-France Gallet, Pierre Magnin, Guilaine Sabine, Pierre-Yves Fonteix, Corinne Flavin, Roland Francoise, Stéphanie Lorente, Gilbert Degras, Colette Alvarez	1,545	0.54	
Synergy Europe	Kelly Citadelle-Velin, Henri Ananelivoua, Lysette Chavez-Levy, Carl Agapit, Jacqueline Blancard épouse Payet, Jean-Charles Bury, Margaret Tanger, Jean-Claude Clain, Patricia Gerard	1,192	0.42	
Europe–Democracy–Esperanto	Monique Fillat, Jacques Étienne, Jannick Huet, Bert Schumann, Emmanuelle Paris, Robert Allandrieu, Annick Darnet, Gilles Leseigneur, Raphaele Bruyat	940	0.33	
Feminists for Europe in Solidarity	Grace Ndame Mpondo, Rodolphe Battery, Linda Weil-Curiel, Abdoul M'chindra, Dhoiharati Boura, Pierre-Étienne Bouchet, Jeanne Tirolien, Germain Mathieu, Léontine Chard	862	0.30	
Reunionnais Citizens' Movement	Jean-Roland Ango, Isabelle Daville, Rosien Duchemann, Marie Lepinay, Didier Lauret, Tasnime Alibay, Bruno Cheron, Nafissati Ali Boina, Jean Dena	827	0.29	
Thank you Overseas!	Jean-Pierre Mapolin, Micheline Mapolin, Bruno Theresine, Cynthia Goula, Paul Capel, Nelly Soubdhan, Judes Ilard, Rose Jeanne, Jean-Philippe Segalas	225	0.08	
AEI	Guy Hadji, Béatrix Arrii, Carmello Scaramozzino, Amandine Dalmasso, Thierry Bardagi, Sylvie Roy, Jean-Michel Albanese, Joselane Palmers, Roland Scaramozzino	93	0.03	
European Federalist Party	Roseline Surveillant, Mathieu Verniers, Natalie Jannin, Troy Davis, Naïma Moghir, Gauthier Auclair, Léa Cailloet, Jérôme Sayag, Lucie Morilhat	48	0.02	
Turnout		303,065	17.00	

=== 2009 ===
European Election 2009: Overseas Territories
List	Candidates	Votes	Of total (%)	± from prev.
UMP	Maurice Ponga Marie-Luce Penchard, Yolaine Costes, Boris Chong-Sit, Véronique Papilio-Halagahu, Cyrille Melchior, Chantal Maignan, Tearii Alpha, Daourina Romouli	103,247	29.69	+4.37
PCR	Élie Hoarau Madeleine de Grandmaison, Hirohiti Tefaarere, Maya Cesari, Georges Bredent, Caroline Machoro-Reignier, Younous Omarjee, Sergine Kokason, Makalio Folituu	73,110	21.01	−7.86
PS	Patrice Tirolien Ericka Bareigts, Catherine Néris, Keitapu Maamaatuaiahutapu, Abouchirou Said, Henri-Michel Pene, Kalala Kulifekai Dit Sako, Daniel Roneice, Denise Zettor	70,514	20.26	+1.21
EELV	Harry Durimel, Rahiba Dubois, Vetea Jacques Bryant, Marie-Odile Walter, Ahamada Salime, Janine Arnell, Michel Dubouille, Marie Grondin, Maximilien Vaea Hauata	56,502	16.24	+7.61
MoDem	Gino Ponin-Ballom, Nicole Bouteau, Max Orville, Sophia Hafidou, Raymond Esdras, Sandrine Ligatai, Thierry Robert, George Habran-Mery, Didier Leroux	32,322	9.29	−1.15
Libertas	Erika Kuttner-Perreau, Yohan Noel, Arlette Gelanor, Jules Simana, Juliette Nubret, Vincent Sabattier, Hélène Gilot, Jean-André Senailles, Maguy Maurinier	10,015	2.88	+2.88
Europe–Democracy–Esperanto	Jacques Étienne, Aline Mori, Vincent Jegat, Sandrine Voelcker, Georges Garnier, Sandrine Martin, Yves Le Prioux, Soana Duron, Patrick Neveux	1,537	0.44	
CNIP	Daniel Mugerin, Catherine Bouchy, Alain Chaumet, Annaïk Glanton, Thierry Abraham, Sylvie Blaise, Hervé Liechty, Michèle Morin, Patrick Cros	225	0.07	
AR	Grégoire Andriantslama, Joëlle Corette, Patrice Joly, Sandrine Obadia, Albert Ventrillard, Dominique Fitremann, Vianney Gremmel, Patricia Favas, Népomucène Guiraud	127	0.05	
Rally for the Citizens' Initiative	Annie Marciniak, Roger Touron, Renée Spanoudis, Jean-Michel Barreyre, Michèle Brun, Laurent Barreyre, Jeannine Fernandez, Pierre Savel, Colette Tinel	102	0.03	
AEI	Amandine Dalmasso, Roland Scaramozzino, Béatrix Arri, El Hadj Danouni, Joselane Palmers, Guy Hadji, Cécile Pinault, Jean-Marie Gautier, Sylvie Roy	95	0.03	
Turnout		375,624	22.96	

=== 2004 ===
European Election 2004: Overseas Territories
List	Candidates	Votes	Of total (%)	± from prev.
PCR	Paul Vergès Madeleine de Grandmaison, Paul Naprix, Nicole Moeabouteau	109,529	28.87	
UMP	Margie Sudre Georges Puchon, Georges Servier, Jean-Marc Aimabl, Claudy Movrel, Mohamed Moustoifa	96,062	25.32	
PS	Jean-Claude Fruteau Catherine Néris, Ateleno Moleana, Moimoudou Madi, Siliako Lauhea, Martine Vasseur	72,291	19.05	
UDF	Jean-Marcel Maran, Nalini Veloupoule, Jean-Yves Flejo, Marie-Laure Banisette, Adballah Hassani, Clodine Lacave	39,622	10.44	
LV	Harry Durimel, Brigitte Wyngaarde, Didier Baron, Isabelle Urban, Louis-Léonce Lecurieux-Lafferronay, Gladys Lintz	32,760	8.63	
FN	Huguette Fatna, Guy George, Emmanuelle Monie, Hamada Oousseni, Alexandrine Hugron, Roger Rode	10,774	2.84	
Far left	Ghislaine Joachim-Arnaud, Jean-Yves Payet, Danielle Diakok, Jean-Marie Nomertin, Angèle Laupa-Cledor, Didier Lombard	7,421	1.96	
Rally of French Taxpayers	Jean-Manuel Neves, Christine Miguet, Frédéric Lefèvre, Viviane Allart	4,013	1.06	
RPF	Jean Jean-Joseph, Juliette Adonicam, Abraham Wamo Bole, Madeleine Etheve, Yvon Elisabeth-Flora, Maryse Taurus	3,119	0.86	
Say No to Racism!	Bernard Law Wai, Marie-Claire Sernont, Louis-David Ferblantier, Antoinette Souprayen Cataye	2,578	0.68	
Better Living with Europe	André Fages, Laurence Acitno, Achille Birba, Marie-Nicole Valmy	1,179	0.31	
Federalist Party	Lionel Guinault, Anne Benoit, Roland Nativel, Anne Claeyssen	42	0.01	
Socio-professional Party	Francioli Dancrade, Danielle Elima, Sylvain Venumiere, Sophie Lambeaux	9	0.00	
United France	Séverine Lallouette, Gérard Combal, Nadine Ramos, Grégory Richarte	8	0.00	
France from Below	Nadine Dabancens Baillivet, Dominique Granjon, Béatrice Jouvenceau, Emmanuel Laurent	0	0.00	
Turnout		379,407	27.77	
