= Younous Omarjee =

French politician (born 1969)

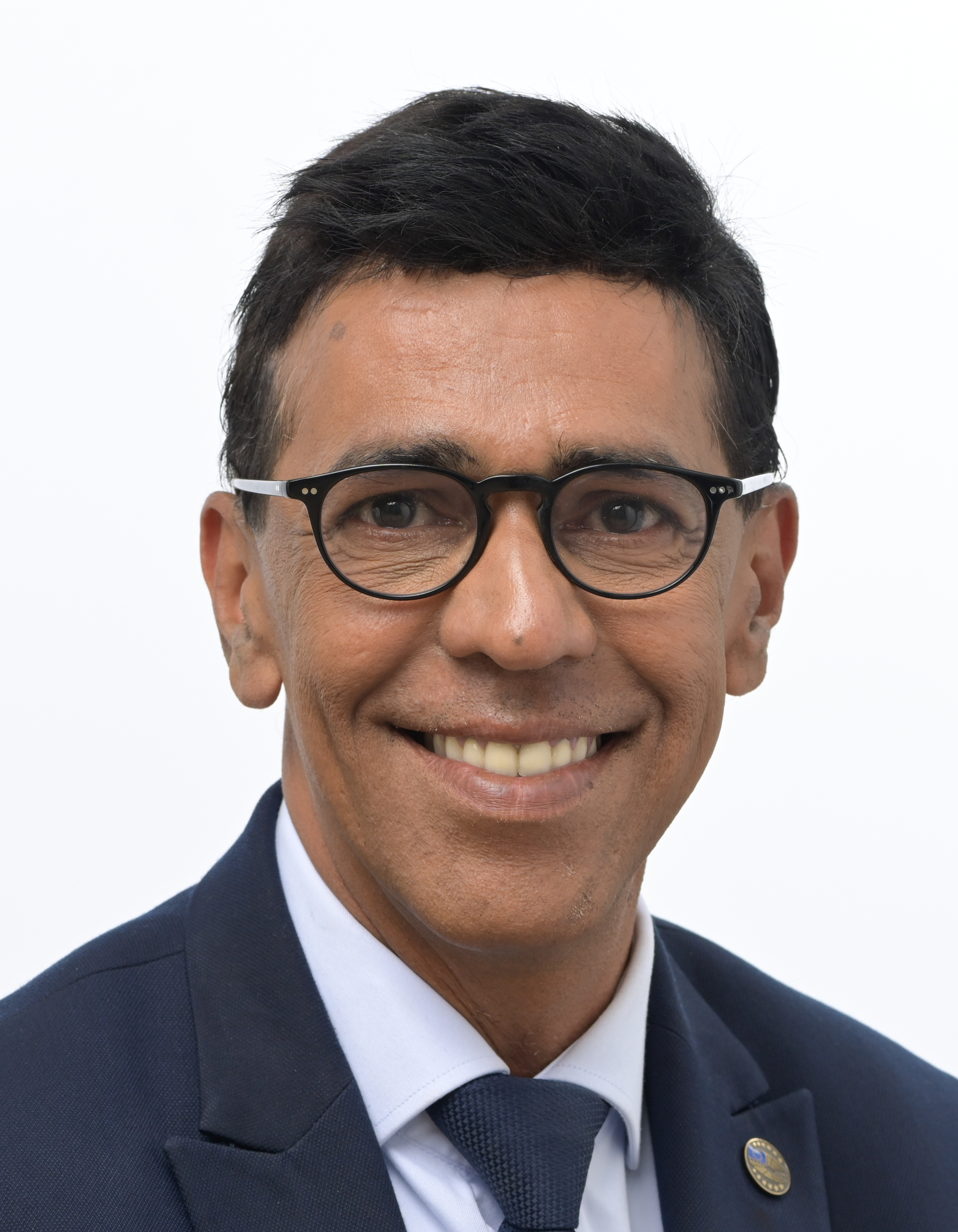
- Omarjee in 2024

Vice-President of the European Parliament
- Incumbent
- Assumed office 16 July 2024 Serving with See List
- President: Roberta Metsola

Member of the European Parliament for France
- Incumbent
- Assumed office 4 January 2012
- Constituency: Overseas Territories of France

Personal details
- Born: 30 September 1969 (age 57) Saint-Denis, Réunion, France
- Party: La France insoumise
- Other political affiliations: Alliance of the Overseas
- Education: Pantheon-Sorbonne University
- Occupation: Politician

Younous Omarjee (born 30 September 1969) is a French politician who has been serving as a Member of the European Parliament since 4 January 2012. He sits with The Left in the European Parliament.

He is originally from Réunion Island, an island in the Indian Ocean that is an overseas department and region of France.

He is also known for having secured the ban on electric pulse fishing and for the proclamation of slavery as a crime against humanity by the European Parliament.

== Political career ==
=== Vice President of the European Parliament ===
On 16 July 2024, Younous Omarjee was elected Vice-President of the European Parliament.

He holds several responsibilities relating to interinstitutional relations, territorial cohesion and social inclusion.

He is responsible for relations with the European Committee of the Regions and the European Economic and Social Committee, ensuring coordination and dialogue between the European Parliament and these consultative bodies representing local and regional authorities, as well as organised civil society.

He also oversees relations with the French authorities concerning Parliament’s seat, including administrative, logistical and political matters related to the functioning of the Parliament’s seat in Strasbourg.

In the legislative sphere, he takes part in interinstitutional conciliation procedures, contributing to negotiations aimed at reaching agreements between the European Parliament, the Council and the European Commission.

Younous Omarjee is also a member of several Bureau working groups, including Sustainable Infrastructure and Services, Citizens’ Language and Linguistic Services, Gender Equality and Diversity.

In addition, he is entrusted with representing the President of the European Parliament, Roberta Metsola, in specific external relations, notably for contacts with local and regional authorities, for relations with Africa and the Organisation of African, Caribbean and Pacific States, for matters concerning EU islands, outermost regions, overseas countries and territories, and small island developing states.

==== Official visits and travels in his capacity as Vice President ====
In May 2025, Younous Omarjee travels to Addis Ababa, Ethiopia, to the headquarters of the African Union, where he notably meets with Mahamoud Ali Youssouf, President of the Commission of the African Union.

In July 2025, Younous Omarjee travels to the headquarters of the United Nations in New York City. He meets with the President of the United Nations General Assembly, Philémon Yang.

On 27 June 2025, he takes part in the 7th African Union - European Union Summit in Luanda.

=== President of the European Parliament's Committee on Regional Development (2019-2024) ===
Between July 2019 and July 2024 , Omarjee has been chairing the European Parliament Committee on Regional Development. He was also a member of the Conference of Committee Chairs, of the European Parliament Committee on Budgets and of the European Parliament Committee on Budgetary Control.

In addition to his committee assignments, Omarjee was one of the vice-presidents of the European Parliament Anti-Racism and Diversity Intergroup and a member of the European Parliament Intergroup on LGBT Rights, the European Parliament Intergroup on the Welfare and Conservation of Animals, and the URBAN Intergroup.

He was elected Vice-President of the European Parliament on 16 July 2024.

==== Mitigating the social and economic consequences of the COVID-19 pandemic ====
During the COVID-19 pandemic, Younous Omarjee coordinated the rapid adoption of the Coronavirus Response Investment Initiative (CRI) and Coronavirus Response Investment Initiative Plus (CRII+), which enabled the mobilisation of EU cohesion funds to help Member States and regions address the economic, social and health consequences of the crisis.

He chaired negotiations with the Council of the European Union on the REACT-EU regulation (Recovery Assistance for Cohesion and the Territories of Europe), which provided an additional €50 billion to support regions most affected by the pandemic. The regulation introduced temporary flexibility measures, including the possibility of 100% EU co-financing, and contained specific provisions for the outermost regions.

==== European response to the Refugee crisis after the aggression of Russia in Ukraine ====
Omarjee was involved in the European Union’s response to the Russian invasion of Ukraine. Shortly after the outbreak of the war, he travelled with European Commissioner Elisa Ferreira to Poland to visit reception centres and assess the situation at the border. He subsequently contributed to the preparation and adoption of the CARE regulation (Cohesion’s Action for Refugees in Europe), aimed at supporting Ukrainian refugees and the European cities and regions hosting them.

He later travelled to Kyiv to meet members of the Verkhovna Rada and Ukrainian officials, including the Chief of Staff to President Volodymyr Zelenskyy and the Mayor of Kyiv, Vitali Klitschko, to discuss the implementation of EU assistance.

==== Negociator on the European Union’s cohesion policy framework (2021-2027) ====
He chaired over interinstitutional negotiations on the European Union’s cohesion policy framework for the 2021–2027 programming period, including the Just Transition Fund, the Common Provisions Regulation, the European Regional Development Fund (ERDF), the Cohesion Fund and the Interreg Regulation. With a total budget of approximately €390 billion, cohesion policy represents one of the largest components of the EU budget.

As Chair and rapporteur, he also oversaw the adoption of European Parliament reports calling for the development of an Atlantic macro-regional strategy, a Mediterranean macro-regional strategy and a renewed strategy for European islands.

Omarjee has supported initiatives aimed at strengthening regional adaptation to climate change. Following the floods of summer 2021 in Germany, the Netherlands and Belgium, he visited affected areas as part of parliamentary missions focused on recovery.

Throughout his mandate, he represented the European Parliament at meetings of EU ministers responsible for cohesion policy and conducted official visits in several Member States.

=== Member of the European Parliament ===
Younous Omarjee has been a Member of the European Parliament since 4 January 2012, re-elected on 25 May 2014 on the "Union pour les Outremer" ("Union for Overseas Territories") list and on 26 May 2019 on the La France Insoumise list.

He sits in the Committee on Budgets (BUDG) the Committee on Budgetary Control, the Committee on Regional Development (REGI), the Delegation for relations with China, the Delegation for relations with India.

=== Political adivisor to Paul Vergès ===
Younous Omarjee was a close advisor of Paul Vergès, founder the Communist Party of Réunion with whom he worked for more than ten years.

In 1999, Paul Vergès invited him to join his team as a parliamentary assistant in the French Senate, where they notably worked on the 'Vergès Law" which made the fight against the greenhouse effect a national priority. From 2004 onwards, he continued in this role alongside Paul Vergès at the European Parliament, before becoming a Member of the European Parliament himself in 2012, succeeding Élie Hoarau.

Alongside Paul Vergès, Younous Omarjee was involved in the creation of the National Observatory on the Effects of Global Warming (ONERC) and in the first institutional climate initiatives in France.
