= Indians in Réunion =

Total population
- 220,000

Regions with significant populations
- St André, St Denis, St Louis

Languages
- Réunion Creole, French, Gujarati, Tamil, Telugu, English

Religion
- Majority : Hinduism; Minority : Catholicism, Islam, Pentecostalism

Related ethnic groups
- Non-resident Indian and Person of Indian Origin, Indian diaspora in France, Malbars, Zarabes, Karanes, Tamils, Telugus, Bhojpuris, Awadhis, Gujaratis

Indians in Réunion are people of Indian origin in Réunion. They form two ethnic groups on the island, Malbars (Hindus or Christians) and Zarabes (Muslims).

== Origins ==
Originally brought in as indentured laborers, as in Mauritius, they were mostly of South Indian Tamil origin. However, these "Sugar Indians" also included a large Telugu component, as well as a noticeable Bhojpuri and Awadhi population, all of whom merged into a single ethnicity dominated by Tamil influence. The second and smallest group was composed of Sunni Muslims from Gujarat, who came as a trading or retail community. There were also later emigrants, mostly Hindu traders and businessmen. In Réunion, Indians from South India, often Hindu, are known as Malbars and Muslim Indians from Northwestern India are known as Zarabes.

Additional communities, among the later settlers, are the Franco-Pondicherrians (known as the Pondichériens), either Hindu or Christian, who initially constituted the sole living Tamil-speaking community on the island, and the Karanes, a Gujarati Shia Muslim community which came from Madagascar after the independence of that country from French rule.

== Today ==
Indo-Réunionnais people have affected the culture of Réunion, bringing Indian cuisine as well as flora and fauna to the island. The Indo-Réunionnais Hindus have mainly assimilated with other ethnicities on the island.

== Malbars ==
Originally brought in as indentured labourers as in Mauritius, they were mostly South Indian Tamils. Tamils in Reunion have recently exhibited the desire to learn their ancestors' culture and have started studying their language and religions, especially from Tamil Nadu and Pondicherry. They also want to translate their newly acquired civic and political rights into a gradual and increasing participation in local and other elections. Notable contributors include:

- Mr Jean-Paul Virapoullé, Mayor of Saint-André (1972-2008 and since 2014), Deputy of the National Assembly (1986-1997), Senator (2001-2011) and First Vice President of the General Council of Reunion.
- Mrs Nadia Ramassamy, Deputy of the National Assembly since 2017, previously Vice President of the General Council.
- Mr Saminadin Axel Kichenin, Mayor of Sainte-Marie (1983-1990), Vice President of the General Council.
- Mrs Denise Nillameyom, Deputy Mayor of Le Tampon.

== Demographic factors ==
Many are Christians and Hindus, including some who are nominally Christian but include Hindu practises. There is a significant Muslim minority known as Zarabes. Others are Sikh, Baháʼí or non-religious. Hare Krishna is also practised in Réunion. They speak Réunion Creole and French. There are a handful of schools where Indian languages such as Tamil may be studied as a third or fourth language.
