= Madeleine de Grandmaison =

Martinican politician (born 1938)

Madeleine Jouye de Grandmaison, née Nol, (born 27 January 1938 in Le Morne-Rouge, Martinique) is a Martinican politician and member of the Martinican Democratic Rally.

She has been a member of the regional council since the 1980s, representing first the Martinican Progressive Party (PPM) and, since 2005, the new Martinican Democratic Rally led by Claude Lise (President of the General Council).

She became MEP on 14 October 2007, following the resignation of Paul Vergès.

For the 2009 European elections, she was the top candidate in the Atlantic Section of the DOM-TOM constituency for the Overseas Alliance (Alliances des Outre-Mers) list led by Élie Hoarau.

Grandmaison is also head of the Martinique Tourist Board.
