= Hoarau =

Hoarau is a surname common in Réunion. Notable people with the surname include:

- Gérard Hoarau, politician from the Seychelles
- Élie Hoarau, politician representing Réunion, husband of Gélita
- Gélita Hoarau, politician representing Réunion, wife of Élie
- Guillaume Hoarau, footballer from Réunion
- Olivier Hoarau (born 1975), French politician
- Pauline Hoarau, model from Réunion

== See also ==
- Stade Théophile Hoarau, a stadium in Réunion
