= Maurice Ponga =

French politician (born 1947)

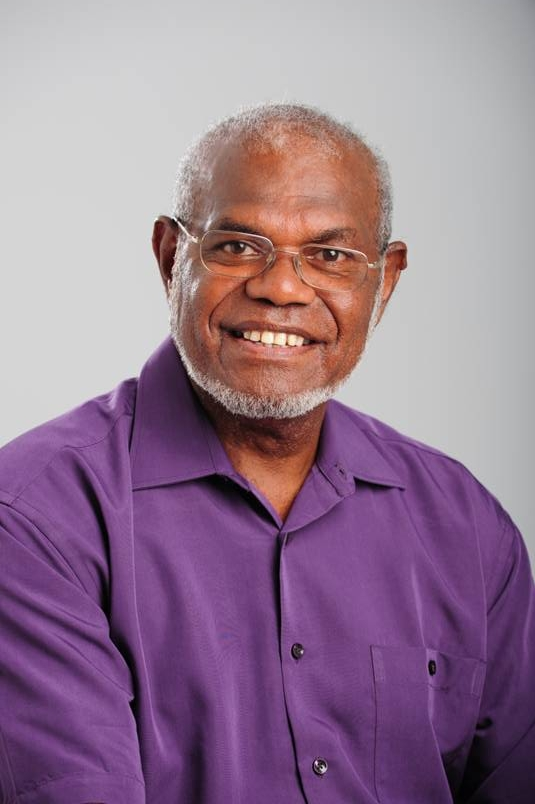

Member of the European Parliament for Overseas Territories
- In office 2009 – 2019
- Preceded by: Margie Sudre

Personal details
- Born: June 5, 1947 (age 78) Kouaoua, New Caledonia
- Citizenship: French
- Party: The Rally
- Relations: Alcide Ponga (nephew)

Maurice Ponga (born 5 June 1947 in Kouaoua, New Caledonia) is a French politician who served as a Member of the European Parliament (MEP) from 2009 until 2019. He was elected in the 2009 European election for the Overseas constituency.

== Political career ==
Ponga is a Melanesian (Kanak), but unlike most Kanaks, he opposes New Caledonia's independence from France and is a member of The Rally-UMP, a major anti-independence party. He has represented the party, known as RPCR until 2002, in the Congress of New Caledonia between 1995 and 2009. While in office, he participated in all but one New Caledonian government. Most recently, as Minister of Youth and Sports in the Martin II government, he played a major role in the success of Noumea's bid for the 2011 Pacific Games.

In the 2009 European elections, Ponga was the UMP's candidate in the Pacific Section of the Overseas constituency, and his candidacy was locally supported by all anti-independence parties. The UMP won one seat in the constituency with 29.7% of the votes, and since the UMP obtained its highest result in the Pacific Section (44.4%), Ponga was elected to the European Parliament. He is the second New Caledonian and second Kanak to serve as an MEP, after Dick Ukeiwé (also a member of the RPCR), who served between 1989 and 1994.

In the Republicans’ 2017 leadership election, Ponga endorsed Laurent Wauquiez.

== Recognition ==
In 2019, Ponga was the winner of the Development Award at The Parliament Magazine's annual MEP Awards.
