= Hoareau =

Hoareau is a surname of French origin. Notable people with this surname include:

- Joanna Hoareau (born 1979), Seychellois sprinter
- Lorenzo Hoareau (born 2007), Seychellois footballer
- Ronny Hoareau (born 1983), Seychellois footballer

== See also ==
- Hoarau
