= 1983 Réunionese Regional Council election =

Regional Council elections were held in Réunion on 20 February 1983. The Rally for the Republic–Union for French Democracy–Departmentalist Militant Front alliance emerged as the largest in the Council, winning 18 of the 45 seats.

== Results ==
Party	Votes	%	Seats
RPR–UDF–FMD	76,763	38.80	18
Communist Party of Réunion	64,801	32.76	16
Socialist Party	25,722	13.00	6
New Union for the Interests of Réunion	20,630	10.43	5
Socialist Party dissidents (Jean-Max Nativel)	5,809	2.94	0
Socialist Party dissidents (Daniel Cadet)	4,098	2.07	0
Total	197,823	100.00	45
Valid votes	197,823	98.72	
Invalid/blank votes	2,575	1.28	
Total votes	200,398	100.00	
Registered voters/turnout	268,352	74.68	
Source: La Réunion

== Aftermath ==
Following the elections, the President of the Regional Council was elected by the Council on 28 February. Mario Hoarau of the Communist Party of Réunion was elected in the third ballot.

Candidate	Party	First round		Second round		Third round	
Candidate	Party	Votes	%	Votes	%	Votes	%
Mario Hoarau	Communist Party of Réunion	22	50.00	22	51.16	22	50.00
Auguste Legros	RPR–UDF–FMD	17	38.64				
Pierre Lagourge	New Union for the Interests of Réunion	5	11.36	21	48.84		
Marc Gérard						22	50.00
Total		44	100.00	43	100.00	44	100.00
Valid votes		44	100.00	43	97.73	44	100.00
Invalid/blank votes		0	0.00	1	2.27	0	0.00
Total		44	100.00	44	100.00	44	100.00
Source: La Réunion
