= Hôtel de Ville, Sainte-Marie, Réunion =

Town hall in Sainte-Marie, Réunion, France

Hôtel de Ville
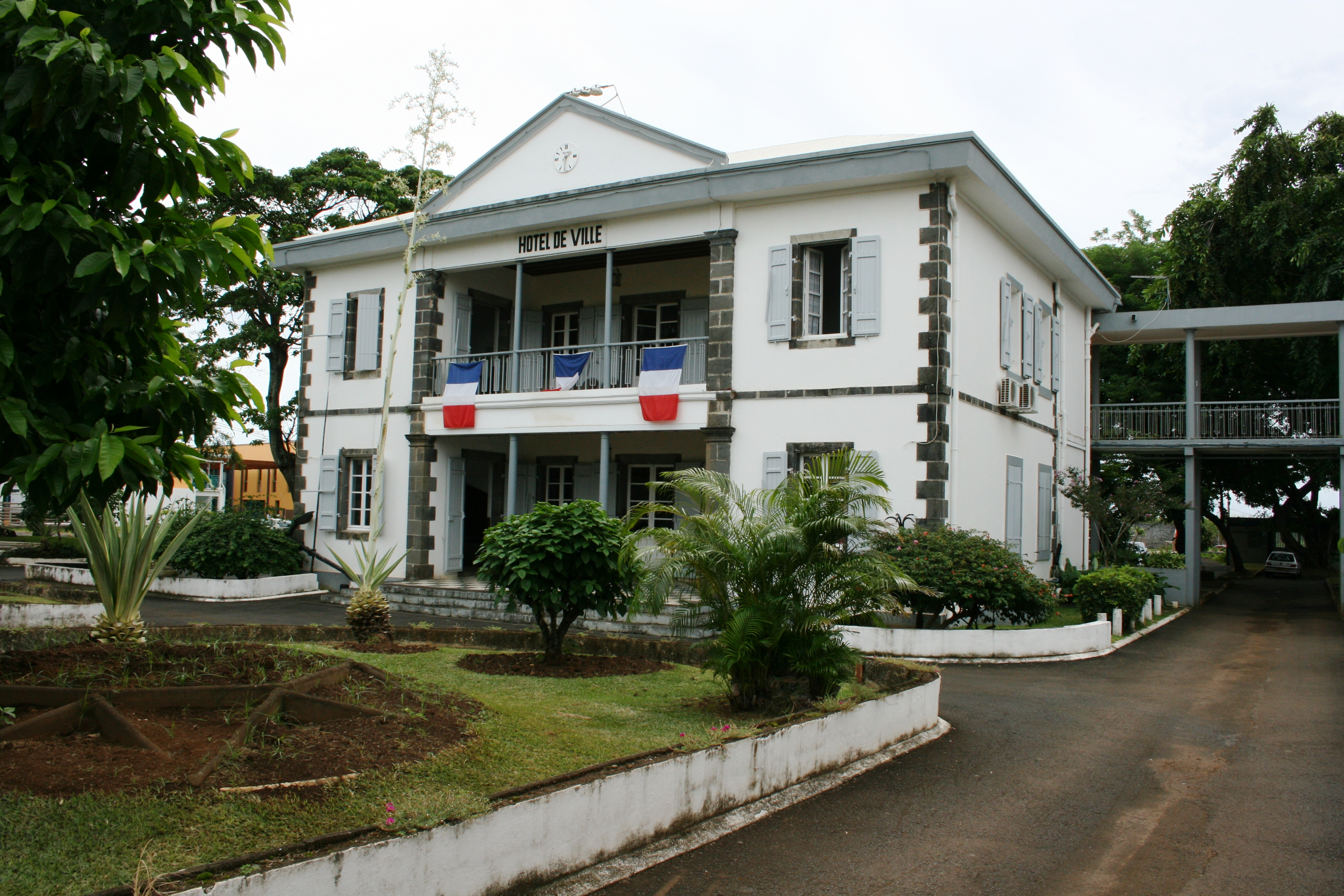
- The main frontage of the Hôtel de Ville in April 2009
- Interactive map of the Hôtel de Ville area

General information
- Type: City hall
- Architectural style: Neoclassical style
- Location: Sainte-Marie, Réunion, France
- Coordinates: 20.8969°S 55.5493°E
- Completed: 1860

The Hôtel de Ville (French pronunciation: [otɛl də vil], City Hall) is a municipal building in Sainte-Marie, Réunion, in the Indian Ocean, standing on Rue de la République.

== History ==
Following the French Revolution, the town was elevated to the status of a commune in 1790, and the town council decided to establish its own town hall. However, by the mid-19th century, the building was inadequate and, in 1853, the council considered selling it. At this time, there were at least 27 sugar producers operating in Sainte-Marie, more than in any other town on the island. This industrial production was supported by a large influx of indentured workers from South India known as the Malbars.

In the context of this large increase in population, the council led by the mayor, Charles Fitzgerald, decided to commission a new town hall. The site they selected was on the north side of Rue de la République. The new building was designed in the neoclassical style, built in brick with a cement render finish and was officially opened by the next mayor, Benjamin Vergoz, in 1860.

The design involved a symmetrical main frontage of five bays facing onto Rue de la République. The central section of three bays contained three square headed doorways, which were recessed under a canopy supported by iron poles: on the first floor, there were three more square headed doorways, which were also recessed in a similar way, creating a balcony. The outer bays were fenestrated by casement windows with shutters on both floors and, at roof level, there was a cornice. Above the central section, there was a pediment with a clock in the tympanum. Internally, the principal room was the Salle des Marriages (wedding room).

The building was restored after being severely damaged by Cyclone Jenny in February 1962. It was then modernised and extended in 1980. In September 2022, the wedding room was renamed the Salle des Mariages Anne Mousse to commemorate the life of Anne Mousse, who was the first Réunionese woman born on the island.
