= Noor-e-Islam Mosque =

Mosque in Saint-Denis, Réunion

- Mosquée Noor-e-Islam
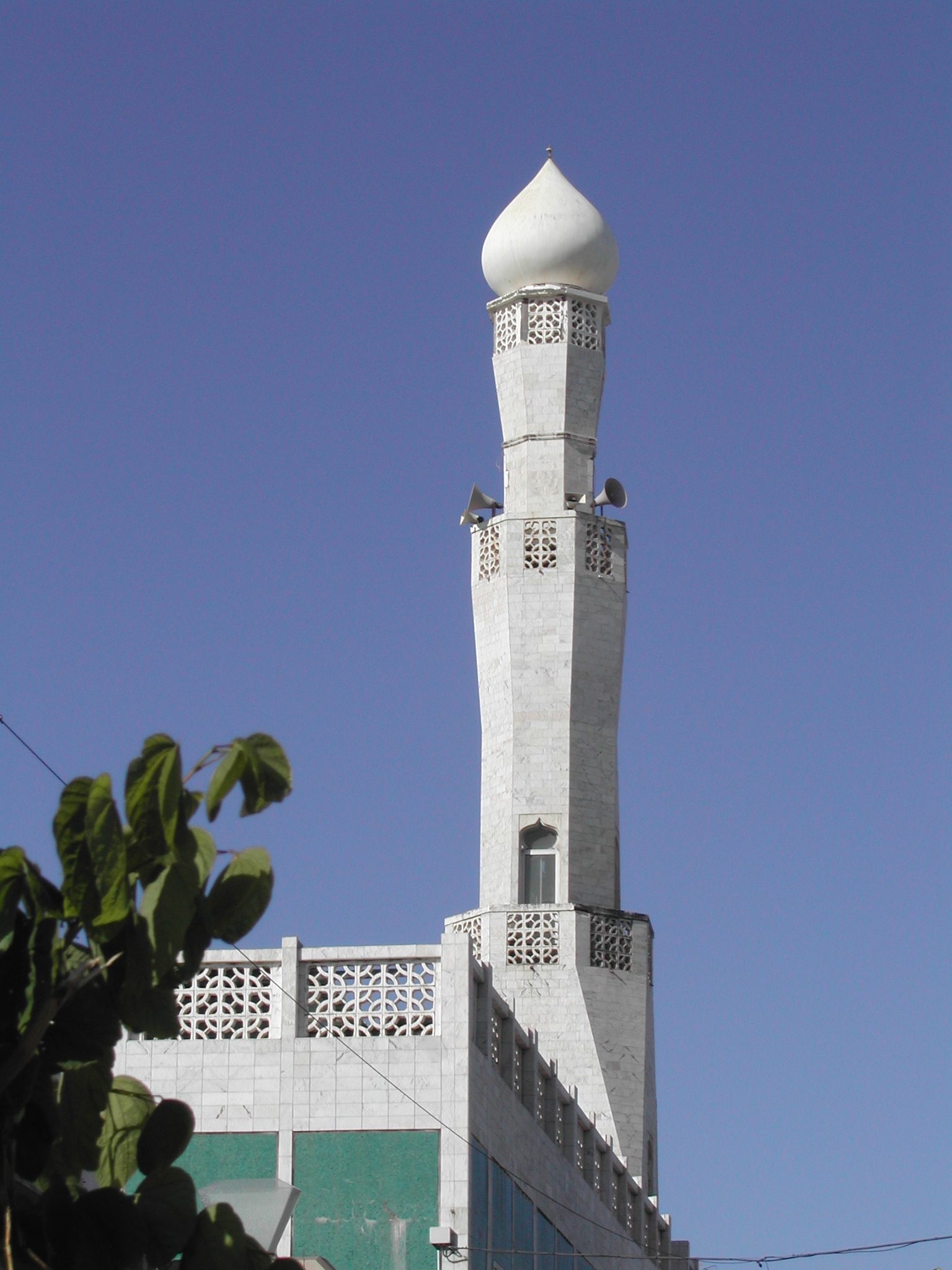

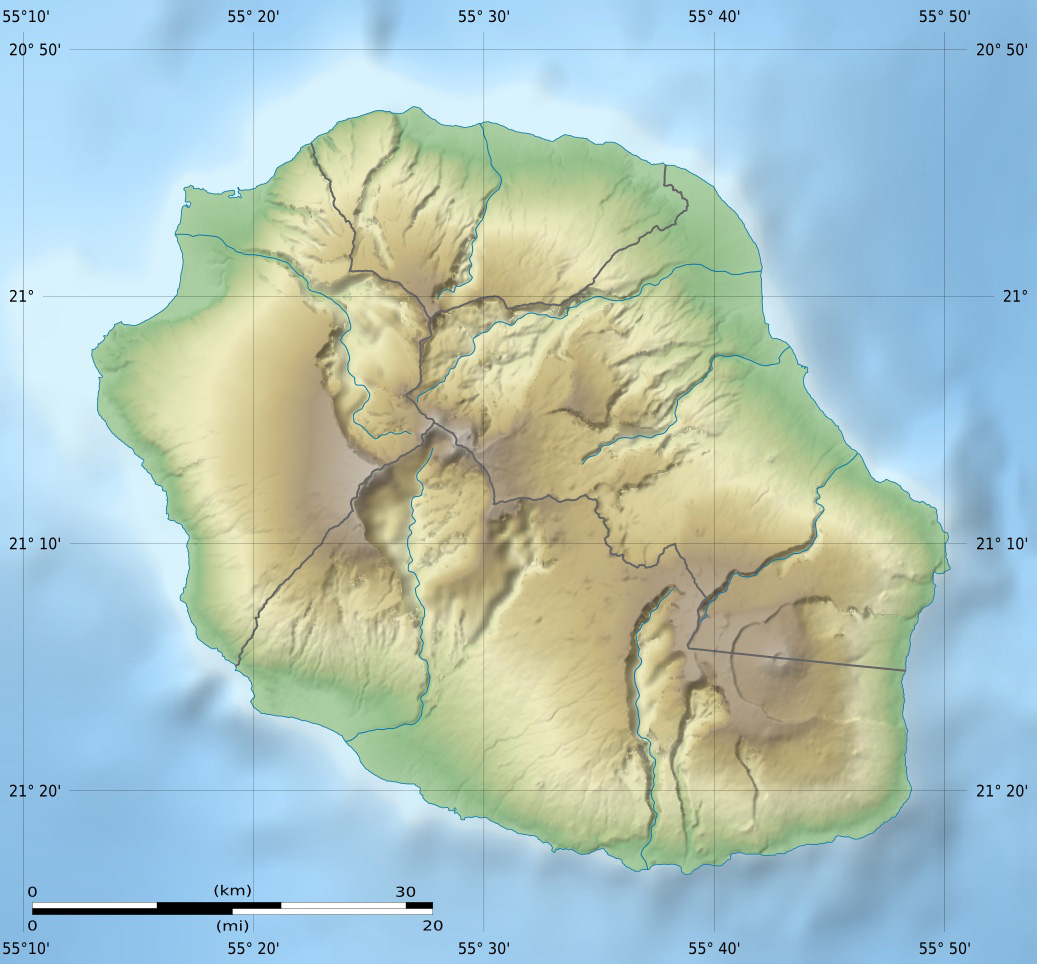
- Location within Réunion

Religion
- Affiliation: Islam
- Ecclesiastical or organizational status: Mosque
- Status: Active

Location
- Location: Saint-Denis, Réunion
- Country: France
- Interactive map of Noor-e-Islam Mosque
- Coordinates: 20°53′S 55°27′E

Architecture
- Type: mosque
- Established: 1890s
- Completed: 1905

Specifications
- Minaret: 1
- Minaret height: 32 m (105 ft)

The Noor-e-Islam Mosque (French: Mosquée Noor-e-Islam) is a mosque in Saint-Denis, Réunion, an overseas department and region of France.

== Overview ==
The original building of the mosque was established in the 1890s. A petition was soon made and granted by Governor Laurent Marie Émile Beauchamps in 1898. The new mosque building then replaced the old building and was completed in 1905.

The windows of the mosque bear the French tricolore. It consists of one minaret that is 32 metres (105 ft) tall.

== See also ==
- Islam in Réunion
- List of mosques in Africa
- List of mosques in France
