= Edmond Lauret =

French politician (1949–2025)

Edmond Lauret (17 May 1949 – 12 December 2025) was a French politician from Réunion.

== Life and career ==
Edmond Lauret was born on 17 May 1949 in Le Tampon, Réunion. He worked as an inspector for the French Treasury.

Lauret was active in Réunion politics, serving as a municipal councilor in Le Tampon, a regional councilor, and a prominent figure on the right-wing political scene in the island.

He entered the French Senate as a senator for Reunion Island on 2 July 1995 and ended his term on 23 September 2001 after not being re-elected.

Lauret died on 12 December 2025, at the age of 76.
