= Canton of Sainte-Marie =

Coordinates: 20.91°S 55.55°E

The canton of Sainte-Marie is an administrative division of Réunion, an overseas department and region of France. Its borders were not modified at the French canton reorganisation which came into effect in March 2015. Its seat is in Sainte-Marie.

It consists of the following communes:

1. Sainte-Marie
