= Marxist–Leninist Communist Organisation of Réunion =

Marxist–Leninist Communist Organisation of Réunion' (French: Organisation Communiste Marxiste Léniniste de la Réunion) was a Maoist-oriented communist organisation in Réunion. OCMLR was founded in 1975, by a group that had left the Reunionese Communist Party. OCMLR strongly advocated independence for Réunion. OCMLR was the predecessor of the Reunionese Independence Movement (MIR).
