= Zarabes =

Muslim community of Réunion

Zarabe (variants: Zarab or Z'arabe) is the name given to the Muslim community of Réunion, who migrated in the mid-19th century. Zarabes are mostly Indian, specifically from the modern state of Gujarat in India.

== Etymology ==
The name is a Réunion Creole word derived from the French words les arabes meaning "the Arabs" (cf. Zoreilles derived from French les oreilles meaning "the ears"). These Indian Muslims were not Arabs, but were described as such likely because of their liturgical use of the Arabic language.

== See also ==
- Islam in Réunion
- Réunionnais of Indian origin
- Malbars
- Indians in France
