= Harry Durimel =

Guadeloupean politician

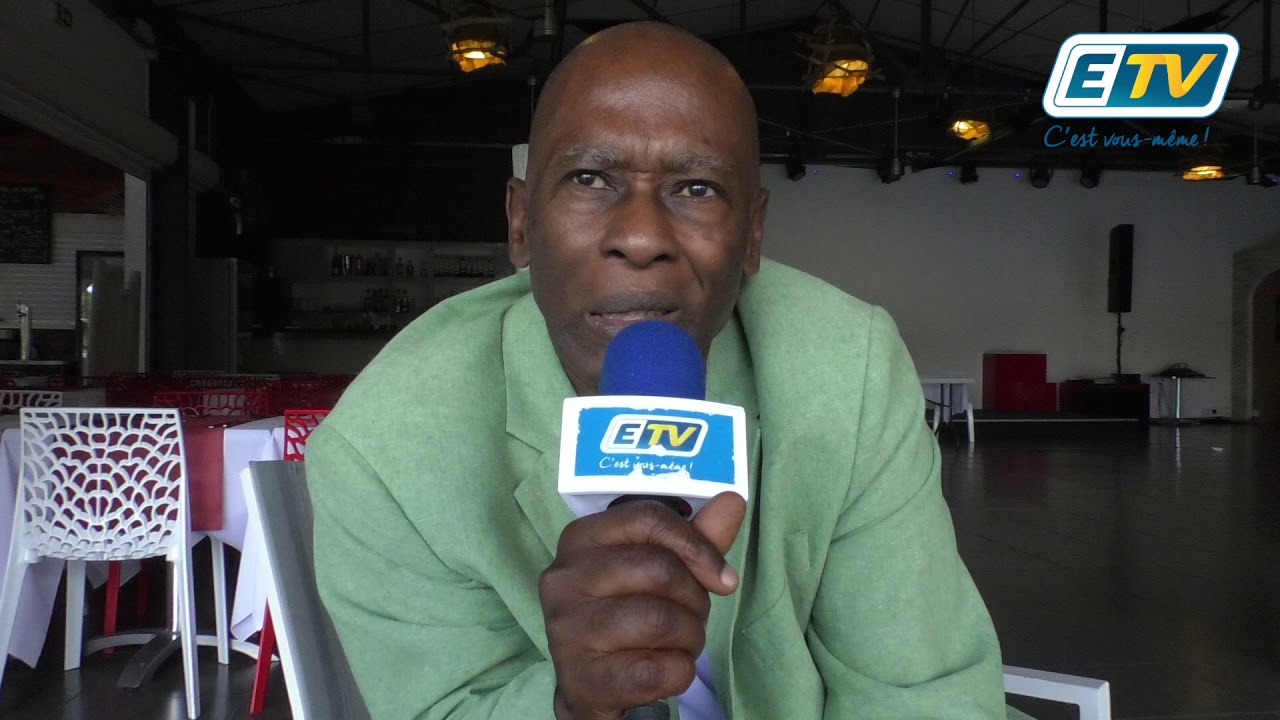
Harry Durimel

Harry Durimel is a spokesperson of Europe Écologie–The Greens and a founding member of The Greens on Guadeloupe. A lawyer, Durimel obtained a Masters in labor law from University Paris I-Pantheon-Sorbonne.

In 2009, he was selected to lead the Europe Écologie list in the DOM-TOM constituency ahead of the 2009 European elections.
