= Catherine Néris =

French politician (born 1962)

Member of the European Parliament
- In office 4 July 2007 – 13 July 2009
- Preceded by: Jean-Claude Fruteau
- Constituency: Overseas Territories of France

Personal details
- Born: 9 June 1962 (age 64) Paris, France
- Party: Socialist Party
- Occupation: Politician

Catherine Néris (born 9 June 1962) is a French politician, who, from 2007 until 2009, was a Member of the European Parliament (MEP) representing the Overseas Territories of France for the Socialist Party.

== Parliamentary service ==
- Member, Committee on the Internal Market and Consumer Protection.
