= Lylian Payet =

French politician (born 1945)

Lylian Payet (born 3 June 1945) is a French politician.

== Career ==
A pedagogical adviser by profession, he joined the French Senate as a senator for Reunion Island on 17 February 1998 and left office on 30 September 2001 after renouncing the right to stand for re-election. He was then a member of the Social Affairs Committee.
