= Éric Boyer (politician) =

French politician (born 1939)

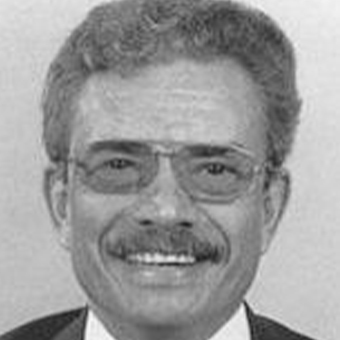
Éric Boyer

Éric Boyer (born 23 June 1939) is a French politician.

== Life and career ==
Boyer entered the French Senate as a senator for Reunion Island on 27 September 1992 and ended his term of office with a declaration of disqualification by the Constitutional Council on 20 January 1996. He was previously a general councillor of Reunion Island and was president of the general council of Reunion Island between 1988 and 1994.
