= Islam in Réunion =

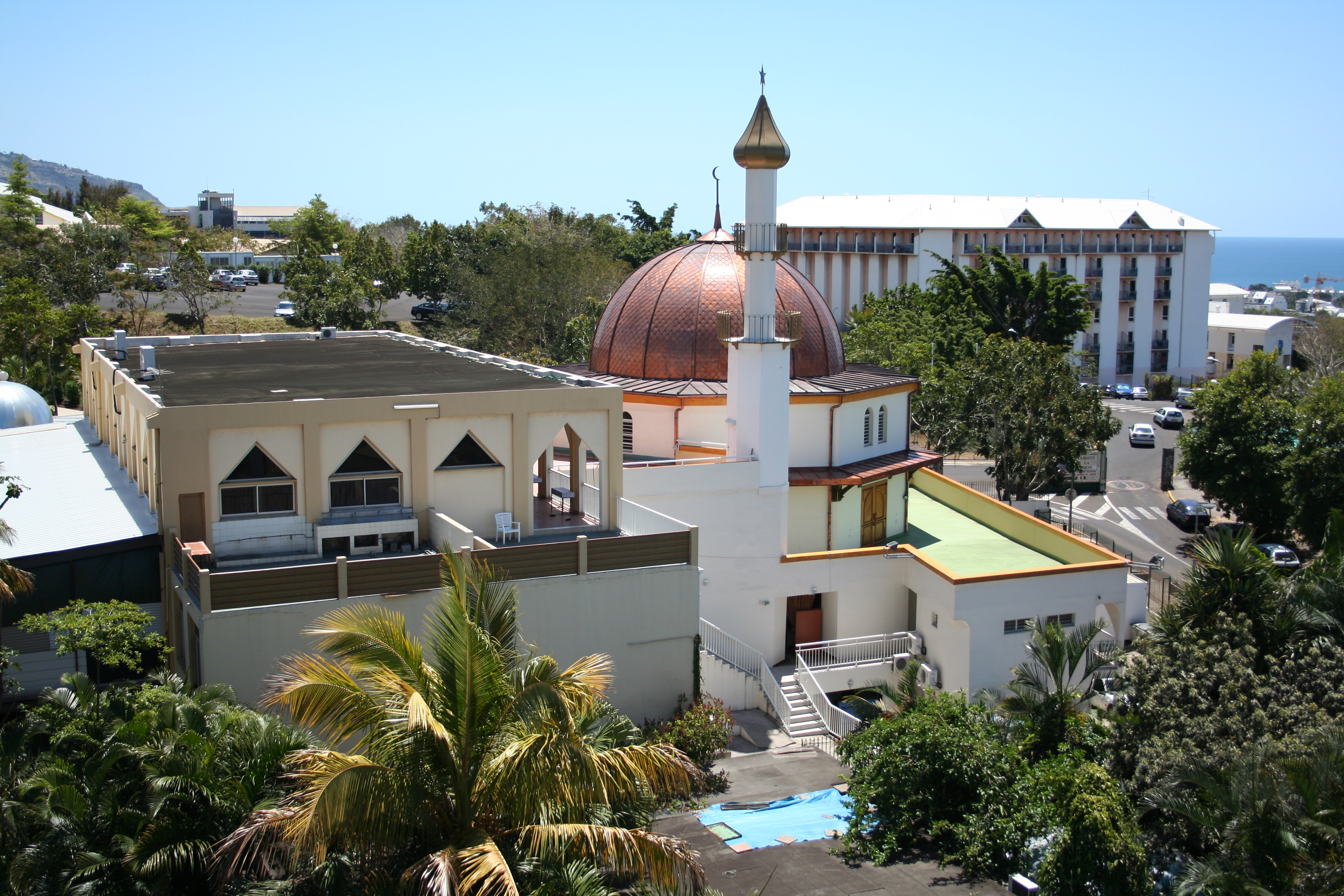
Mosque de Moufia in Saint-Denis, Réunion

Islam is the religion of about 3% of the population of Réunion. Most large towns have a mosque, allowing the Muslim community to practice their religion.

In Réunion, Zarabes is the name given to the Muslim community of Réunion. Muslims first migrated to Réunion in the mid-nineteenth century. Zarabes are mostly South Asian and specifically from the modern state Gujarat in India. More recently, many Muslim immigrants from Mayotte (French overseas departement), the Comoros and other African countries have arrived in Réunion.

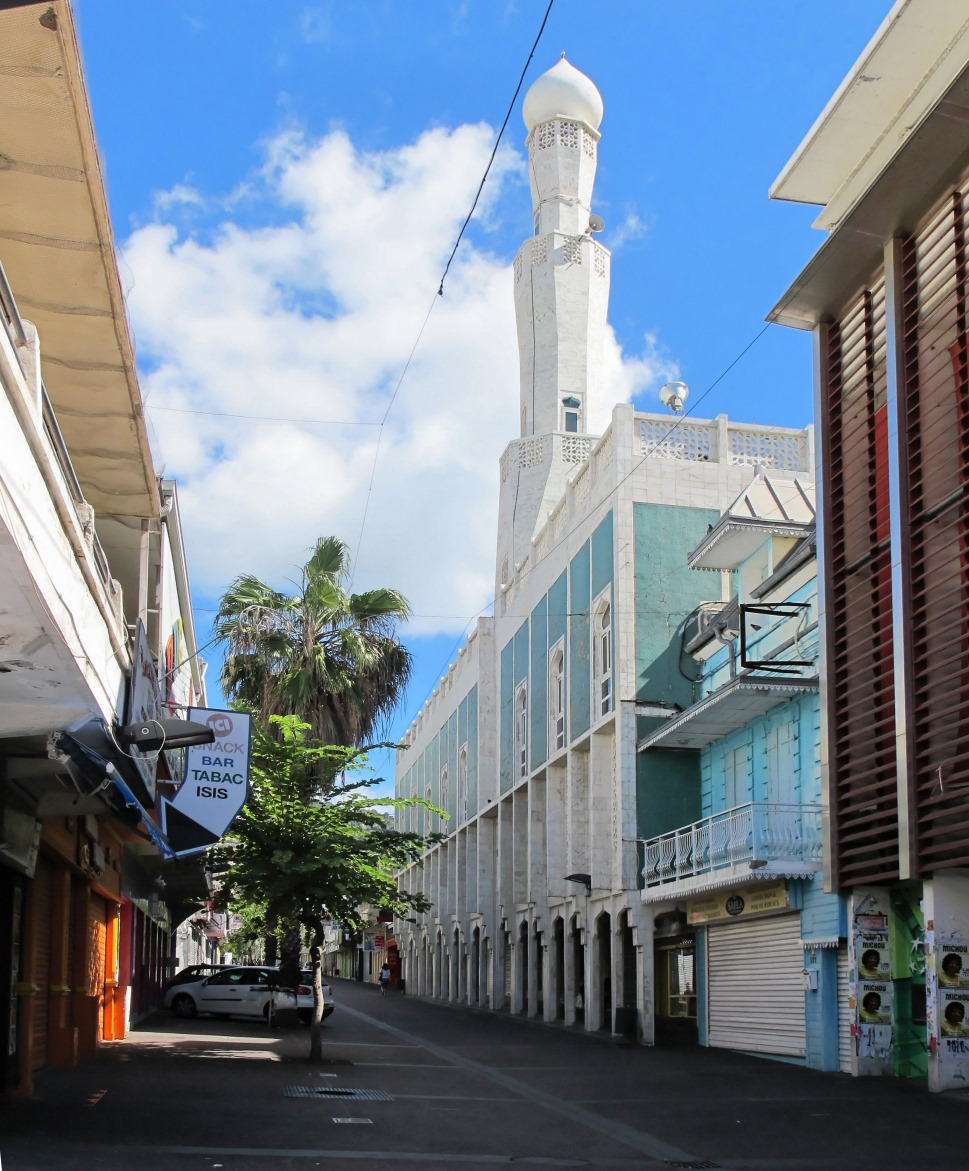
Noor-e-Islam Mosque, Saint-Denis

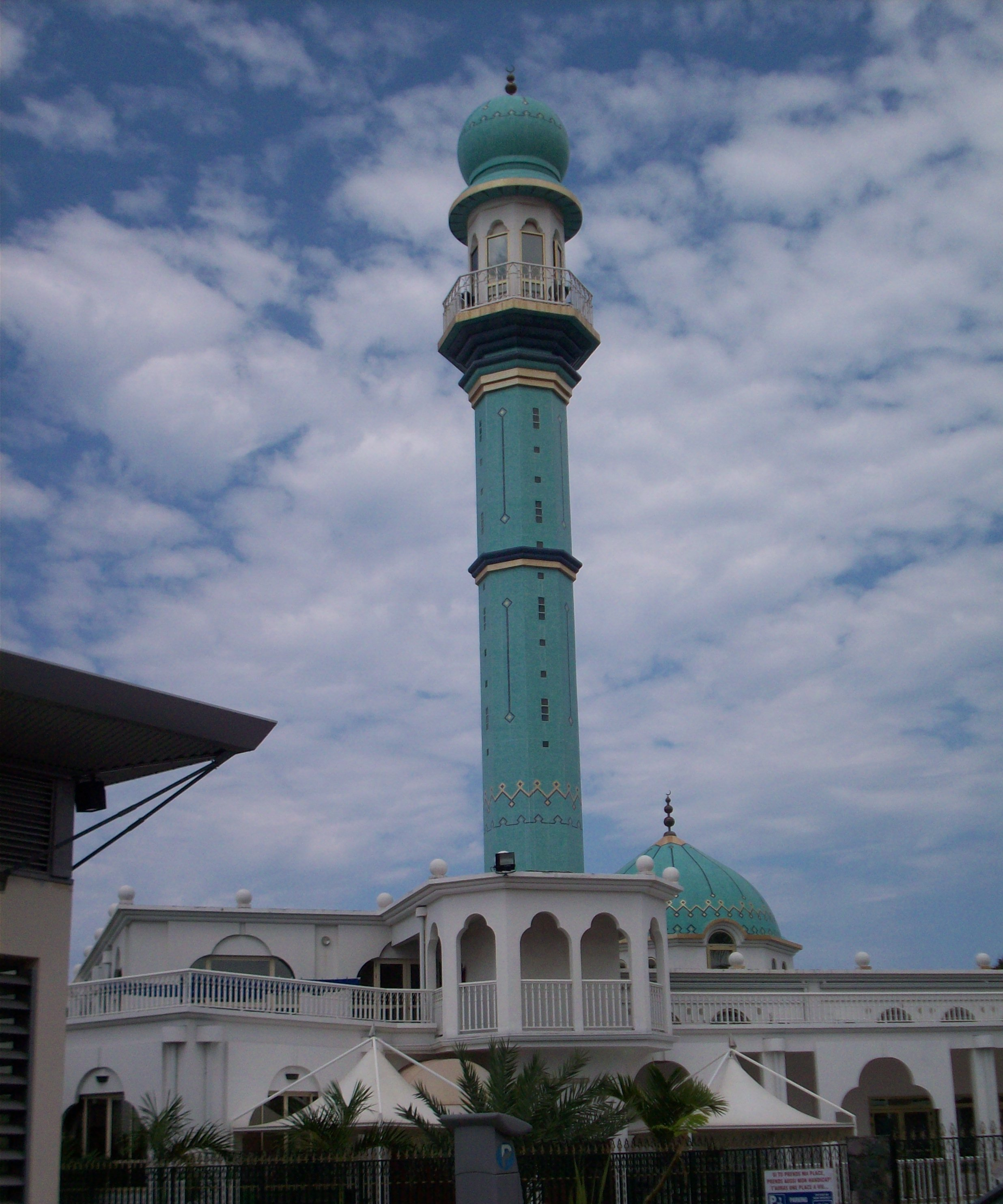
Mosque of Saint-Louis, Réunion

Mosque of Saint-Pierre, Réunion

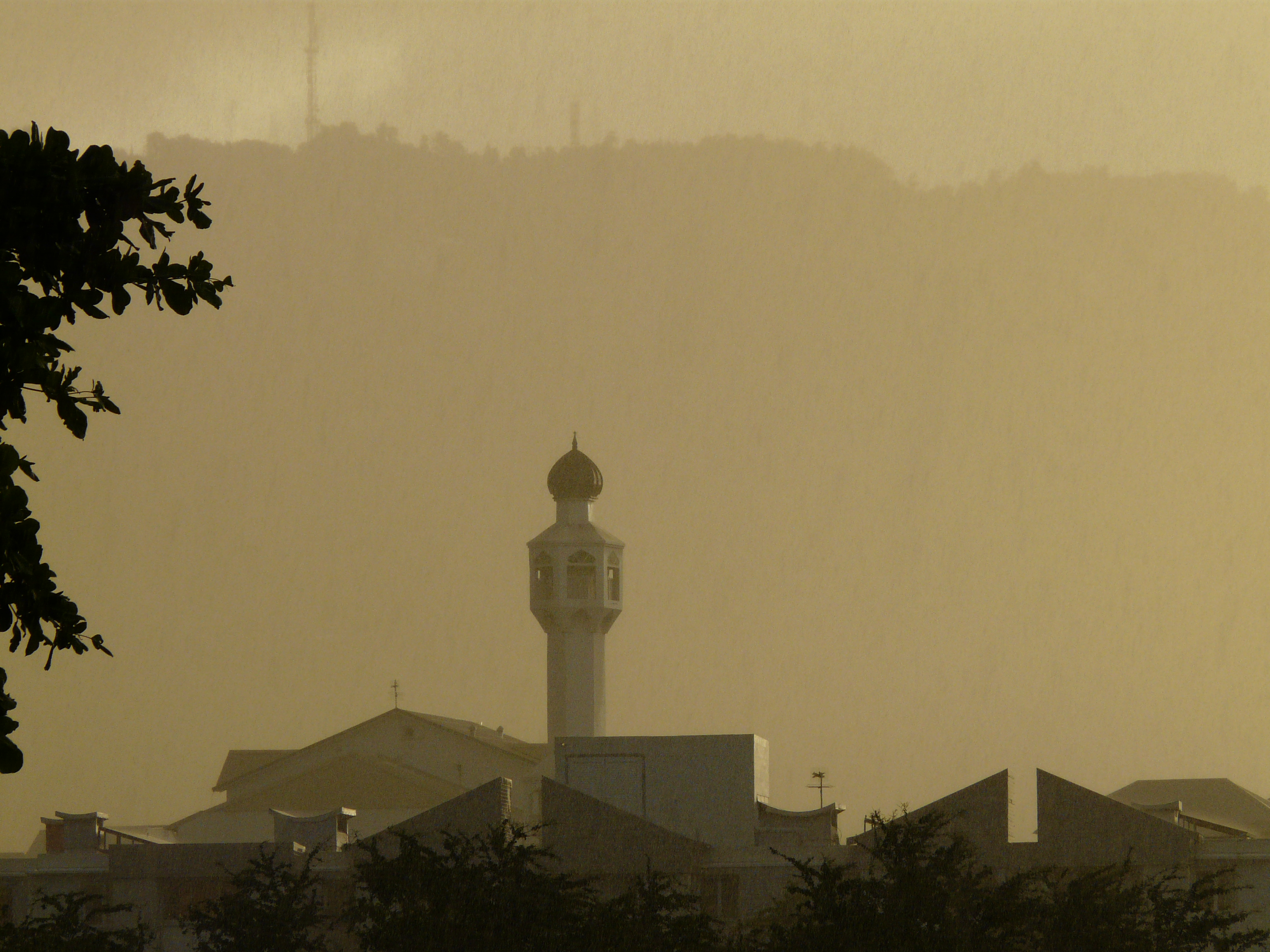
Mosquée des Comoriens

== See also ==
- Zarabes
