= Patrice Tirolien =

French politician (1946–2019)

Member of the European Parliament
- In office 2009–2014
- Constituency: Overseas constituency

Member of the French National Assembly
- In office 1995–1997
- Constituency: Guadeloupe

Mayor of Grand-Bourg

Personal details
- Born: March 17, 1946 Grand-Bourg, Guadeloupe, France
- Died: November 23, 2019 (aged 73)
- Party: Socialist Party
- Occupation: Politician

Patrice Tirolien (17 March 1946 – 23 November 2019) was a French politician who served in the French National Assembly from 1995–1997 and was also a Member of the European Parliament (MEP) elected in the 2009 European election for the Overseas constituency. He was born in Grand-Bourg, Guadeloupe, and was mayor of his home town.

In the 2009 European elections, he was the PS candidate in the Atlantic Section of the Overseas constituency, and his candidacy was locally supported by all anti-independence parties. The PS won one seat in the constituency with 20.26% of the votes, and since the PS obtained its highest result in the Atlantic Section, Tirolien was elected to the European Parliament.

== Bibliography ==
- page on the French National Assembly website
