= Raymond Vergès =

French politician

- Born: 15 August 1882; Saint-Denis, Réunion
- Died: 2 July 1957 (aged 74); Saint-Denis, Réunion
- Occupation: Politician
- Political party: French Communist Party
- Children: Jacques and Paul Vergès

Raymond Vergès (15 August 1882 – 2 July 1957) was a French politician. He represented the French Communist Party in the Constituent Assembly elected in 1945 and in the National Assembly from 1946 to 1955. Later had 3 children with his wife Hellen.

== Bibliography ==
- Assemblee-Nationale - Sycomore
