= Caroline Machoro =

French politician in New Caledonia

Caroline Machoro-Reignier (born October 19, 1952) is a Kanak politician in New Caledonia. A member of the pro-independence Caledonian Union, she led the Kanak and Socialist National Liberation Front alliance in the Congress of New Caledonia from 2011 to 2014. In 1988, she was one of the signatories of the Matignon Agreements between New Caledonian loyalists and separatists.

== Early life and family ==
Machoro was born into the Nakéty tribe, situated between the villages of Canala and Thio, in 1952. She is the younger sister of Éloi Machoro, who served as general secretary of the Caledonian Union beginning in 1981 and minister of security in the self-declared Kanak Socialist Republic provisional government from its creation in 1984. Known as one of the principal organizers of actions during the independence struggle in the 1980s, he was killed by law enforcement officers in 1985. Caroline Machoro and her sisters followed in her brother's footsteps in pursuing independence from France, and in the 1980s she spent four months in prison due to her political activity.

== Political career ==
Machoro was a longtime associate of Léopold Jorédié, who was also from Canala, serving as his administrative secretary. Jorédié had been her brother's No. 2 until his death, succeeding him as provisional minister of security, and became head of the Center Region from 1985 to 1988.

Machoro was part of a Kanak and Socialist National Liberation Front (FLNKS) delegation led by Jean-Marie Tjibaou that traveled to Paris to negotiate peace with the New Caledonian anti-independence movement, Jacques Lafleur's Rally for Caledonia in the Republic. There, she became one of the signatories of the Matignon Agreements between the two sides on June 26, 1988.

After the new institutions established by the accords were put in place, she became deputy director, under Raphaël Pidjot (from 1990 to 1991), then deputy director of the cabinet (from 1991 to 1992) of the president of the North Province's congress, who was none other than Jorédié. She gradually took on more and more senior political advisory roles before deciding to run for Congress herself in 2004.

In the 2004 New Caledonian legislative election, Machoro won a seat as No. 2 on the Caledonian Union (UC) list in the North. In Congress, she became vice president of the Permanent Committee from July 2004 until the end of her term, and rapporteur of the Health and Social Welfare Committee from July 2007 until the end of her term.

In the 2009 New Caledonian legislative election, she was reelected as No. 4 on the UC-FLNKS list, which won 6,420 votes (29.63%). She returned to the Permanent Committee but was no longer its vice present. Instead, she served in various of the Congress' eight vice-presidential slots between May 2009 and the end of her term in May 2014. In 2010, she ran for the presidency of the Congress but lost to the anti-independence incumbent, Harold Martin.

Having previously served as vice president of the FLNKS alliance, she became its president after Roch Wamytan was elected president of Congress in April 2011. She continued to focus her legislative work on taxation, which led to some combativeness with Martin, the congressional president.

In the 2012 French legislative election, she was nominated as an alternate candidate for the FLNKS in New Caledonia's 2nd constituency.

Machoro was reelected again in the 2014 New Caledonian legislative election, having been listed fourth on the local UC-FLNKS list. She became second vice president of the assembly for a period, as well as vice president of the Permanent Commission and president of the Foreign Affairs Commission. She was elected for another five-year term in 2019, which was extended when the 2024 elections were postponed amid unrest on the island.

== Personal life ==
Machoro is married to the Frenchman Gérard Reignier, a fellow UC activist who served as the party's general secretary from 2007 to 2017.
