= Jean-Paul Virapoullé =

French politician

Mayor of Saint-André, Réunion
- Incumbent
- Assumed office 5 April 2014

Member of the French Senate for Réunion
- In office 2001–2011

Personal details
- Born: 15 March 1944 (age 82) Bras-Panon, Réunion
- Party: The Republicans

Jean-Paul Virapoullé (Tamil: ஜான் பால் வீரபிள்ளை) (born 15 March 1944 in Bras-Panon, Réunion) is a member of the Senate of France, representing the island of Réunion.

Virapoullé is a member of the Union for a Popular Movement. A wealthy sugar cane farmer of the Malbar group, he is known as a traditional opponent of the Communist Party of Réunion.

== Bibliography ==
- Page on the Senate website
