= Paul-Alfred Isautier =

Réunion politician

Paul-Alfred Isautier (29 June 1911 - 5 September 1984) was a Réunion politician. He served in the Senate of France from 1959 until 1974.
