= Marcel Vauthier =

French politician

Member of the French National Assembly for Reunion (1st constituency)
- In office 29 June 1946 – 27 November 1946

Senator of the French Republic
- In office 7 November 1948 – 18 June 1955
- Constituency: Reunion

Member of the French National Assembly for Reunion (2nd constituency)
- In office 5 May 1963 – 2 April 1967

Personal details
- Born: November 6, 1910 Saint-Denis, Réunion
- Died: May 26, 1988 (aged 77) Saint-Denis, Réunion
- Citizenship: French (France)
- Party: MRP (1946-1955); CD (1963-1967)

Marcel Vauthier (November 6, 1910 – May 26, 1988) was a French politician.

Vauthier was born in Saint-Denis, Reunion and died in the same city. A lawyer by profession, he was an MP and Senator under the French Fourth Republic and the beginning of the Fifth Republic.

== Mandates ==
- Member of the French Assembly representing Réunion within the Popular Republican Movement from June 29 to November 27, 1946.
- Senator of Reunion within the Popular Republican Movement from November 7, 1948 to 18 June 1955. He is not re-elected at the end of this mandate.
- Member of the French Assembly representing Reunion within the group Democratic Centre from 5 May 1963 to 2 April 1967.
