= Martinican Democratic Rally =

Martinican Democratic Rally Rassemblement démocratique martiniquais
- Abbreviation: RDM
- General Secretary: Claude Lise
- Founder: Claude Lise
- Founded: 26 March 2006
- Split from: Martinican Progressive Party
- Ideology: Martinican autonomism Social democracy Democratic socialism
- Political position: Left-wing
- National affiliation: Democratic and Republican Left group
- National Assembly: 0 / 577
- Executive Council: 0 / 9
- Assembly of Martinique: 1 / 51

Website
- rdmartinique.com

The Martinican Democratic Rally (French: Rassemblement démocratique martiniquais, RDM) is a Martinican political party founded on 26 March 2006 by Claude Lise, Senator and President of the General Council. Lise was a member of the Martinican Progressive Party. The party favours the autonomy of Martinique within France, unlike the nationalist MIM. The party had one seat in the European Parliament, Madeleine de Grandmaison, until 2009.
