= Manapany =

Human settlement in Réunion, France

Manapany-les-Bains
- Village
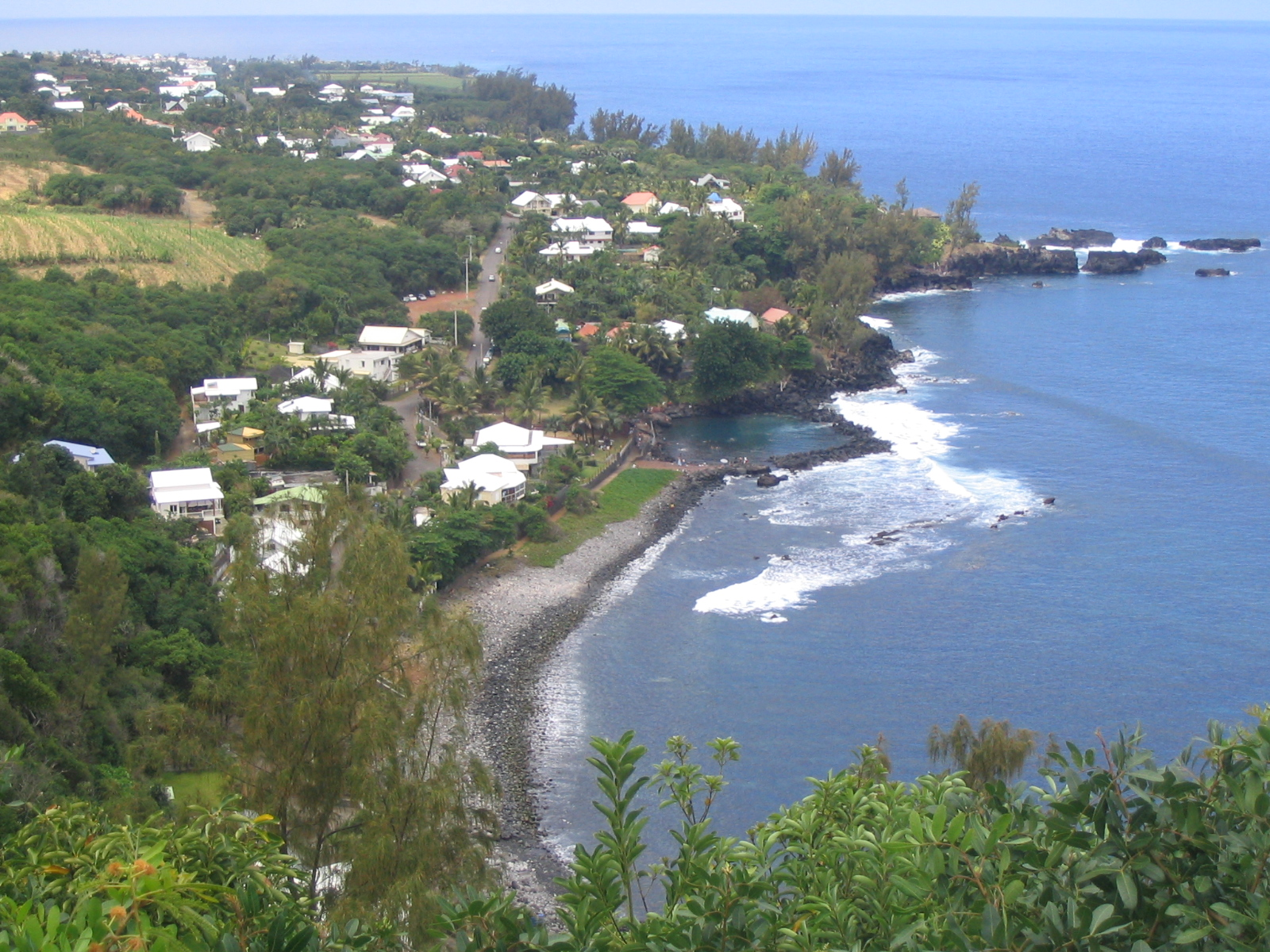
- The village of Manapany. Note the natural basaltic rock pool at the center of the image.

- Location within Réunion
- Coordinates: 21°22′33″S 55°35′41″E
- Country: France
- Island: Réunion
- Time zone: UTC+4:00 (Réunion Time)

Manapany (also known as Manapany-les-Bains) is a village on the island of Réunion. Located on the southern coast, between the communes of Petite-Île and Saint-Joseph, it is a quiet holiday spot with a natural swimming pool made from basaltic rock.
