= Malbars =

Ethnic group of South Indian Tamil origin in Réunion

Total population
- 180,000

Regions with significant populations
- Saint-André, Saint-Denis

Languages
- French, Réunion Creole

Religion
- Hinduism, syncretic religion, Indic religions, Roman Catholicism

Related ethnic groups
- Indo-Réunionnais, Creoles, Indo-Mauritians, Girmitiyas, Tamils, Telugus, Biharis, Bhojpuris, Awadhis

Malbars or Malabars are an ethnic group of Indian origin (mainly from a Tamil background) in Réunion, a French island in the Southwest Indian Ocean, The Malbars constitute 25% of the population of Réunion and are estimated to be around 180,000.

There have been people of South Indian origin on the island since the 17th century, and those were mostly from Pondicherry. Most were originally brought in as indentured labourers in the second half of the 19th century and were mostly South Indian Tamils. Since then, the Malbars have developed some patterns of behaviour that are not quite those of their ancestors from Tamil Nadu nor those of the other inhabitants of Réunion.

== Etymology ==
Malbars is derived from the word Malabar, a term which was used often by the French and other Westerners to refer to all Southern Indians, including the Tamils, Malayalees, Telugus and Kannadigas. This term is based on the Malabar region of the present state of Kerala in India. This term, applied by the French to Tamil labourers coming to Réunion, has been kept by the latter and others on the island to label their own identity.

== History ==
Indian workers came to Réunion from Southern India, mostly from the current-day Tamil Nadu or Andhra Pradesh (the first indentured workers who came to Réunion were Télingas), and to a lesser extent from the lower Gangetic Plains in Northern India (current-day Central and Eastern Uttar Pradesh, Bihar), the latter ones being known as the "Calcutta". These migrants where recruited and boarded through the French settlements of Pondicherry (Pondichéry), Karaikal (Karikal) and Yanam (Yanaon), but as well from the British ports of Madras and Calcutta. While most of these immigrants belonged to ritually lower castes, diversity across caste, ethnic, and religious lines also existed. Hard living conditions at home were the main reason behind their departure to La Réunion. The immigration of indentured workers from South India started in 1827 but it was only after 1848 that indentured immigration began on a big scale.

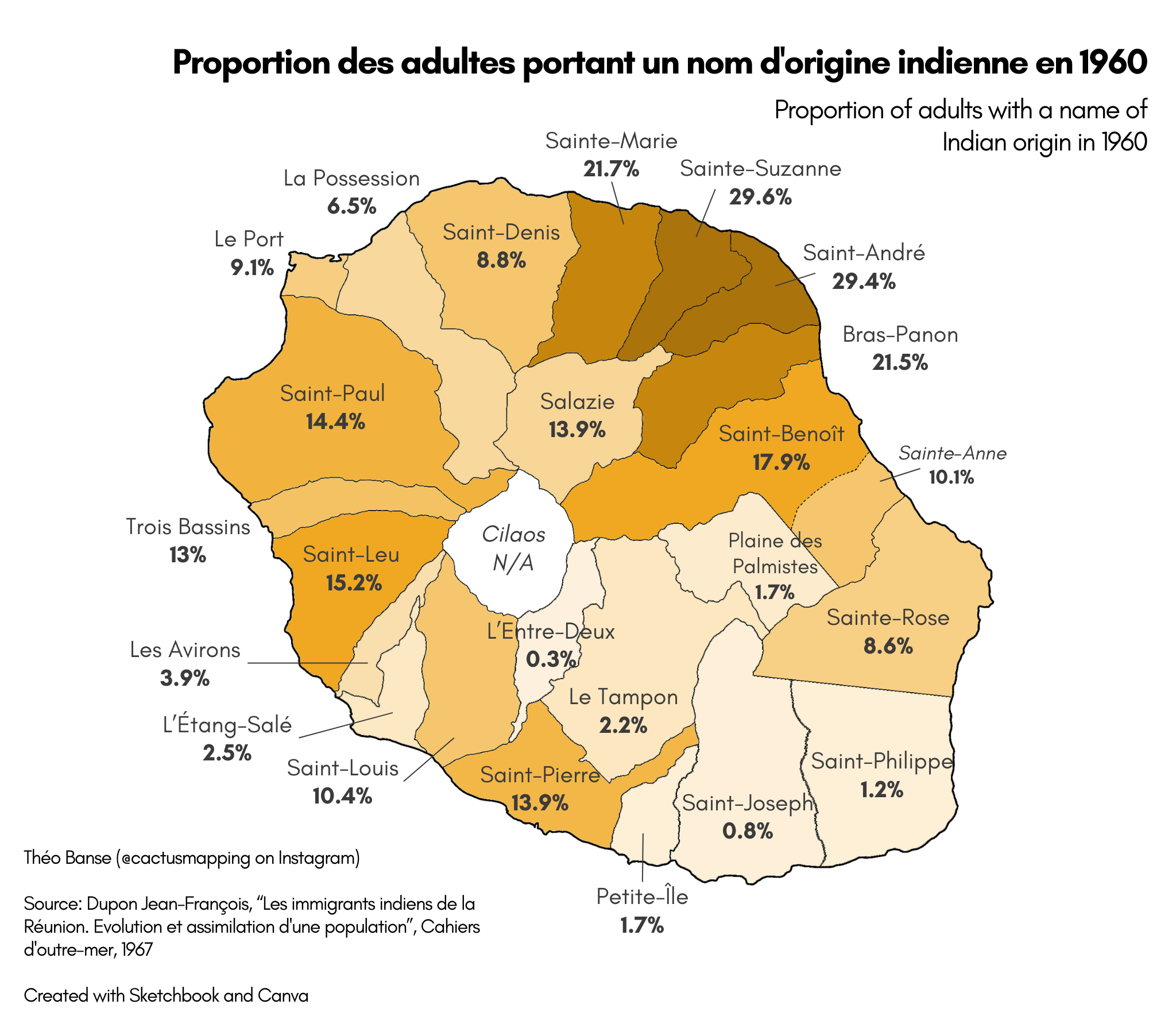
Proportion of adults with a name of Indian origin in Réunion in 1960

== Acculturation ==
During the Kingdom era, the French government enforced the Christianization of the early Malbars, though for many, this conversion remained only nominally. Hindu traditions and rituals, particularly in the form of folk Hinduism, survived well and were historically observed by all Malbars, while undergoing syncretism with Catholicism and other spiritual traditions on the island. Freedom of worship and community gathering were granted by estate landowners, as was often stipulated in indentured contracts under a secular French Republic. Consequently, many temples, known locally as Chapelles malbars, were established within plantation areas and in cities. Nonetheless, local pressure to prohibit Malbar practices, often equated with witchcraft, persisted due to the enduring influence of the Church in Réunion.

Tamil and other Indian languages were lost to language shift. As with nearly all native inhabitants of Reunion Island, the mother tongue of the Malbars is Reunionese Creole.

== Recent developments ==
The Malbars desire to learn their ancestors' culture, and started studying their language and religions especially from Tamil Nadu. Recently many Malbars, particularly those of upper and middle classes, have started to become completely Hindu rather than nominally Christian.

== Genetics ==
A genetic study has shown that the majority of the Indian origins of Malbars lie in the South-east of India. A significantly larger proportion comes from Andhra Pradesh, and Tamil Nadu. The study also showed that 15-20% of the origins of Malbars come from elsewhere than India. Less than 1% comes from Europe.

== Notable Malbars ==
- Jean-Paul Virapoullé is currently Mayor of Saint Andre and first Vice President of the General Council of Réunion.

== Tamil temples ==
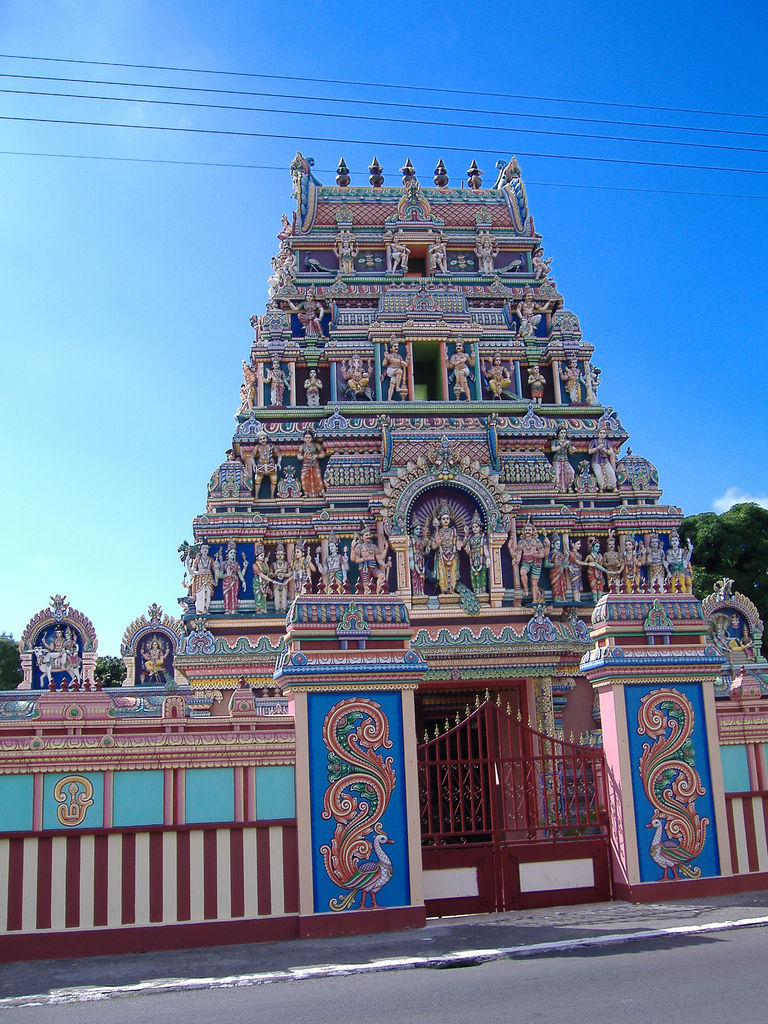
A Hindu temple (temple tamoul) in the commune of Saint-André, Réunion.

- Chinmaya Mission temple, Quartier Francais, Sainte-Suzanne
- Siva Soupramanien temple, Saint-Paul
- Siva-Vishnou-Karli temple, Saint-Paul
- Siva Soupramanien temple, Petit-Bazar on Avenue Ile-of-France, Saint-Andre
- Sri Bala Subramanya temple, Saint Paul
- Temple du Colosse, Saint André
- Thiru Kalimata Temple, Sainte-Marie

== See also ==
- Réunionnais of Indian origin
- Tamil diaspora
- Hinduism in Réunion
