= Élie Hoarau =

French politician (born 1938)

Élie Hoarau (born July 8, 1938 in Sainte-Suzanne, Réunion) is a Reunionese politician and member of the Communist Party of Réunion. He is the husband of Senator Gélita Hoarau.

Hoarau was elected as a member of the National Assembly of France from 1986 to 1987, 1988 to 1993, and from 1997 to 2001. He served as mayor of Saint-Pierre, Réunion between 1982 and 2001.

He had to resign, after being sentenced on July 6, 2000, to 1 year imprisonment with suspended sentence and 50.000 FRF (7500 €) fine because of Electoral fraud.

Hoarau has served as Secretary General of the Communist Party of Réunion since 1993.

In 2009, Hoarau was elected as a member of the European Parliament for the DOM-TOM constituency in the 2009 European elections. He resigned in December 2011, and was substituted by Younous Omarjee.
