= Margie Sudre =

French politician (born 1943)

President of the Regional Council of Réunion
- In office 1993–1998
- Preceded by: Camille Sudre
- Succeeded by: Paul Vergès

Secretary of State for Francophonie
- In office 1995–1997
- President: Jacques Chirac
- Prime Minister: Alain Juppé
- Preceded by: Jacques Toubon
- Succeeded by: Charles Josselin

Personal details
- Born: Marguerite Demaiche; 17 October 1943 (age 83) Vinh, Vietnam
- Party: The Republicans
- Spouse: Camille Sudre
- Profession: Physician

Margie Sudre (born 17 October 1943) is a Vietnamese-born Reunionese politician and Member of the European Parliament for France's "Outre-mer".

== Early life, family and education ==
She was born Marguerite Demaiche in Vinh, Vietnam.

She studied and became a physician.

== Politic ==
Before her election to the European Parliament (UMP-"les républicains"), she held several political mandates, both local and national: chairwoman of the Réunion Island regional Council (1993–1998, member since 1998), Secretary of State for the French-Speaking World (1995–1997). She worked to make French the second official language of the Atlanta Olympic Games.

She is a member of the Union for a Popular Movement, which is part of the European People's Party, and sits on the European Parliament's Committee on Fisheries and its Committee on Regional Development.

She is a member of the delegation to the EU–Russia Parliamentary Cooperation Committee, a substitute for the delegation for relations with the countries of Southeast Asia and the Association of Southeast Asian Nations, and, as Head of the French UMP MEP delegation, a member of the EPP-ED bureau.

== Career ==
- Specialisation in anaesthesia and resuscitation (1976)
- Doctor of medicine (1977)
- Replacement anaesthetist (including resuscitation) (1971–1977)
- Anaesthetist (including resuscitation) at the Joan of Arc Clinic (La Réunion) (1977–1995)
- Chairman of the Réunion Island Regional Council (1993–1998)
- State Secretary for the French-Speaking World (1995–1997)
- Member of the European Parliament (elected 1999, 2004). She did not candidate in 2009 elections.
- Knight of the Legion of Honour (1999)
- Officer of the Legion of Honour (2010)
