= Sainte-Marie, Réunion =

Commune in Réunion, France

Sainte-Marie
- Commune
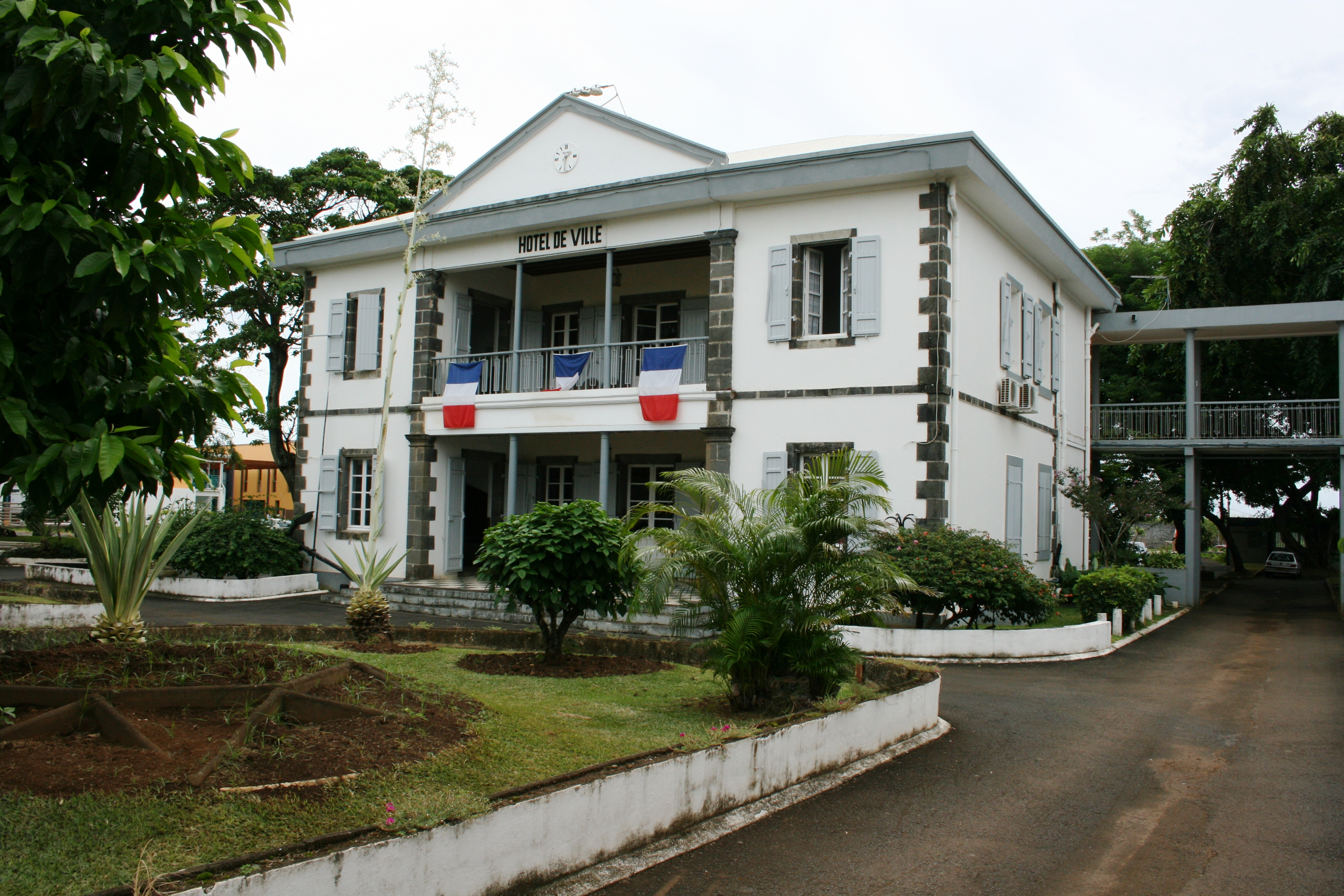
- The Hôtel de Ville

- Coat of arms

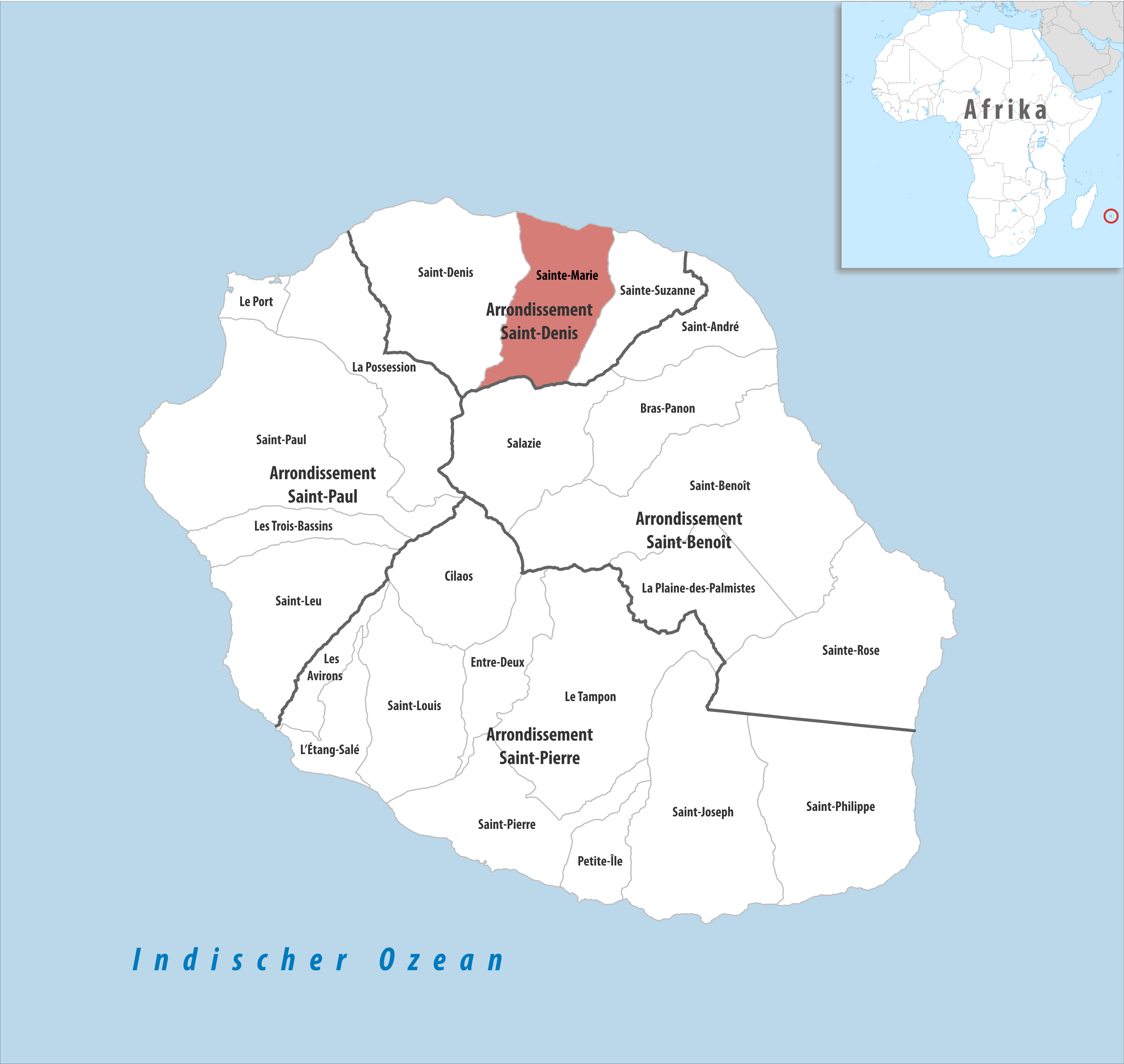
- Location of Sainte-Marie
- Coordinates: 20°53′49″S 55°32′57″E
- Country: France
- Overseas region and department: Réunion
- Arrondissement: Saint-Denis
- Canton: Sainte-Marie
- Intercommunality: Nord de la Réunion

Government
  - Mayor (2020–2026): Richard Nirlo
- Area^{1}: 87.21 km^{2} (33.67 sq mi)
- Elevation: 5 m (16 ft)
- Highest elevation: 1,800 m (5,900 ft)
- Lowest elevation: 0 m (0 ft)
- Population (2023): 37,093
  - Density: 425.3/km^{2} (1,102/sq mi)
- Time zone: UTC+04:00
- INSEE/Postal code: 97418 /97438
- ^{1} French Land Register data, which excludes lakes, ponds, glaciers > 1 km^{2} (0.386 sq mi or 247 acres) and river estuaries.

Sainte-Marie (French pronunciation: [sɛ̃t maʁi]) is a commune in the French overseas department of Réunion. It is located on the north side of the island of Réunion, just east of, and adjacent to, the capital of Saint-Denis.

== History ==
The Hôtel de Ville was completed in 1860.

== Geography ==
=== Climate ===
Sainte-Marie has a tropical monsoon climate (Köppen climate classification Am) closely bordering on a tropical savanna climate (Aw). The average annual temperature in Sainte-Marie is 24.5 °C (76.1 °F). The average annual rainfall is 1,530.3 mm (60.25 in) with February as the wettest month. The temperatures are highest on average in February, at around 27.0 °C (80.6 °F), and lowest in July, at around 21.8 °C (71.2 °F). The highest temperature ever recorded in Sainte-Marie was 35.2 °C (95.4 °F) on 28 January 1993; the coldest temperature ever recorded was 12.8 °C (55.0 °F) on 25 August 1991.

Climate data for Sainte-Marie (Gillot Airport, altitude 8m, 1991–2020 normals, extremes 1953–present)
Month	Jan	Feb	Mar	Apr	May	Jun	Jul	Aug	Sep	Oct	Nov	Dec	Year
Record high °C (°F)	35.2 (95.4)	34.0 (93.2)	33.1 (91.6)	32.7 (90.9)	30.6 (87.1)	29.9 (85.8)	29.0 (84.2)	28.2 (82.8)	29.2 (84.6)	30.5 (86.9)	31.8 (89.2)	34.5 (94.1)	35.2 (95.4)
Mean daily maximum °C (°F)	30.2 (86.4)	30.3 (86.5)	30.0 (86.0)	29.2 (84.6)	27.6 (81.7)	26.2 (79.2)	25.4 (77.7)	25.5 (77.9)	26.0 (78.8)	27.0 (80.6)	28.3 (82.9)	29.5 (85.1)	27.9 (82.2)
Daily mean °C (°F)	26.9 (80.4)	27.0 (80.6)	26.6 (79.9)	25.8 (78.4)	24.2 (75.6)	22.6 (72.7)	21.8 (71.2)	21.9 (71.4)	22.4 (72.3)	23.5 (74.3)	24.7 (76.5)	26.1 (79.0)	24.5 (76.1)
Mean daily minimum °C (°F)	23.6 (74.5)	23.7 (74.7)	23.3 (73.9)	22.3 (72.1)	20.7 (69.3)	19.1 (66.4)	18.2 (64.8)	18.2 (64.8)	18.7 (65.7)	19.9 (67.8)	21.1 (70.0)	22.7 (72.9)	21.0 (69.8)
Record low °C (°F)	18.2 (64.8)	18.6 (65.5)	18.4 (65.1)	15.6 (60.1)	15.3 (59.5)	13.6 (56.5)	12.9 (55.2)	12.8 (55.0)	13.0 (55.4)	13.4 (56.1)	15.0 (59.0)	17.8 (64.0)	12.8 (55.0)
Average precipitation mm (inches)	270.2 (10.64)	279.3 (11.00)	264.5 (10.41)	133.4 (5.25)	95.8 (3.77)	66.9 (2.63)	50.9 (2.00)	54.8 (2.16)	48.5 (1.91)	43.3 (1.70)	62.5 (2.46)	160.2 (6.31)	1,530.3 (60.25)
Average precipitation days (≥ 1.0 mm)	13.8	13.5	13.5	10.9	9.6	7.5	8.5	8.8	7.5	6.9	6.1	10.2	116.8
Mean monthly sunshine hours	218.1	195.5	215.0	216.1	213.9	210.0	222.4	216.2	210.5	210.8	212.0	226.8	2,567.1
Source: Météo-France

Climate data for Sainte-Marie (La Mare - Cirad, altitude 68m, 1991–2020 normals, extremes 2001–2018)
Month	Jan	Feb	Mar	Apr	May	Jun	Jul	Aug	Sep	Oct	Nov	Dec	Year
Record high °C (°F)	33.6 (92.5)	33.6 (92.5)	32.8 (91.0)	32.5 (90.5)	31.2 (88.2)	29.0 (84.2)	29.7 (85.5)	28.3 (82.9)	29.2 (84.6)	30.2 (86.4)	32.3 (90.1)	32.9 (91.2)	33.6 (92.5)
Mean daily maximum °C (°F)	30.3 (86.5)	30.7 (87.3)	30.2 (86.4)	29.4 (84.9)	27.7 (81.9)	26.1 (79.0)	25.4 (77.7)	25.5 (77.9)	26.2 (79.2)	27.2 (81.0)	28.6 (83.5)	29.9 (85.8)	28.1 (82.6)
Daily mean °C (°F)	26.8 (80.2)	27.1 (80.8)	26.7 (80.1)	25.8 (78.4)	24.2 (75.6)	22.5 (72.5)	21.8 (71.2)	21.8 (71.2)	22.4 (72.3)	23.5 (74.3)	24.9 (76.8)	26.3 (79.3)	24.5 (76.1)
Mean daily minimum °C (°F)	23.3 (73.9)	23.5 (74.3)	23.2 (73.8)	22.3 (72.1)	20.7 (69.3)	19.0 (66.2)	18.2 (64.8)	18.1 (64.6)	18.6 (65.5)	19.8 (67.6)	21.2 (70.2)	22.6 (72.7)	20.9 (69.6)
Record low °C (°F)	19.7 (67.5)	19.4 (66.9)	18.8 (65.8)	18.5 (65.3)	15.6 (60.1)	14.9 (58.8)	14.5 (58.1)	13.6 (56.5)	14.5 (58.1)	13.8 (56.8)	16.4 (61.5)	19.3 (66.7)	13.6 (56.5)
Average precipitation mm (inches)	299.5 (11.79)	246.0 (9.69)	274.6 (10.81)	145.6 (5.73)	102.0 (4.02)	74.4 (2.93)	50.1 (1.97)	56.3 (2.22)	55.6 (2.19)	43.9 (1.73)	70.4 (2.77)	135.6 (5.34)	1,554 (61.18)
Average precipitation days (≥ 1.0 mm)	15.3	13.8	15.0	11.6	9.4	8.9	9.1	9.2	8.9	7.7	7.3	10.8	126.8
Source: Météo-France

== Population ==
Historical population
Year	Pop.	±% p.a.
1961	11,414	—
1967	14,367	+3.91%
1974	16,566	+2.06%
1982	17,251	+0.51%
1990	20,158	+1.97%
1999	26,582	+3.12%
2007	31,143	+2.00%
2012	31,596	+0.29%
2017	33,839	+1.38%
2023	37,093	+1.54%
Source: SPLAF and INSEE (1967-2023)

== Transport & Economy ==
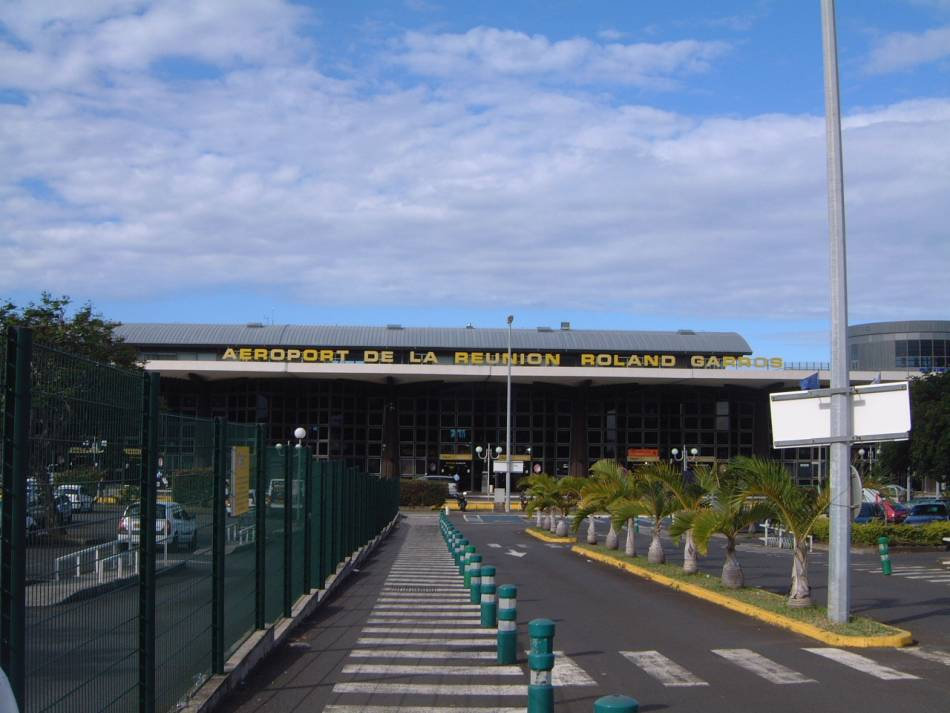
Roland Garros Airport

Reunion's main airport and the Air Austral headquarters are located in Sainte-Marie. There is also a small fishing harbour, a shopping-center and a brewery in the commune.

== Sister cities ==
- Moka Flacq, (Mauritius), since 1992

== See also ==
- Communes of the Réunion department
