= Gélita Hoarau =

French politician (born 1956)

Gélita Hoarau (born 15 January 1956) is a member of the Senate of France, representing the island of Réunion since 2016. She is a member of the Communist, Republican, and Citizen Group. Her husband is Élie Hoarau.
