= Paul Vergès =

Réunionese politician (1925–2016)

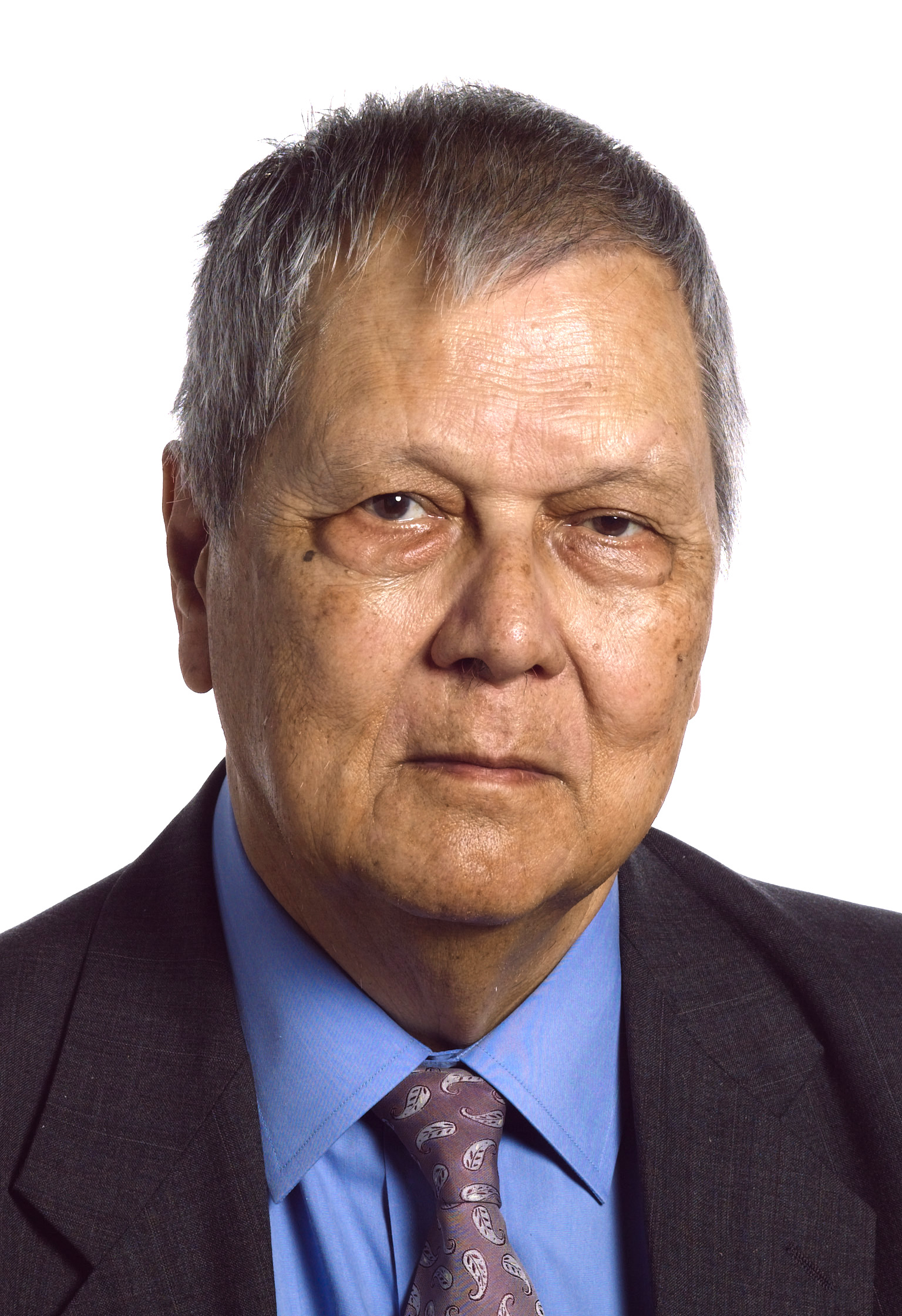
- Vergès in 2004

President of the Regional Council of Réunion
- In office 1998–2010
- Preceded by: Margie Sudre
- Succeeded by: Didier Robert

Member of the French Senate for Réunion
- In office 2011–2016
- Succeeded by: Gélita Hoarau

Mayor of Le Port
- In office 1971–1989

Personal details
- Born: 5 March 1925 Ubon Ratchathani, Kingdom of Siam (present-day Thailand)
- Died: 11/12 November 2016 (aged 91) Saint-Denis, Réunion
- Party: Communist Party of Réunion
- Children: Françoise Vergès
- Parent(s): Raymond Vergès, Pham Thi Khang
- Relatives: Jacques Vergès (brother)

Paul Vergès (French pronunciation: [pɔl vɛʁʒɛ]; 5 March 1925 – 11/12 November 2016) was a Réunionese politician. Born in Ubon Ratchathani, Siam to a French diplomat father and Vietnamese mother. Vergès founded the Communist Party of Réunion in 1960, a party which he led until he retired in 1994. He made a political comeback at the 2005 European Parliament elections, when he was elected as the third candidate on the list of the French Communist Party, part of the European United Left–Nordic Green Left group. Vergès sat in the European Parliament's Committee on Development.

Vergès killed the political opponent of his father, Alexis de Villeneuve, on 25 May 1946. He was condemned for the crime to a sentence of 5 years in prison.

Vergès was an MP in the National Assembly of France from 1957 to 1959, from 1987 to 1988 and from 1994 to 1997. He was a Senator in the French Parliament from 1997 to 2005 and again from 2012 to his death in 2016. From 1980 to 1990 and from 2005 to 2008, he was a member of the European Parliament. He was president of the regional council of Réunion from 1999 to 2011, regional councillor since 2011, mayor of Le Port from 1972 to 1990 and general councillor of La Réunion from 1956 to 1968 and again from 1986 to 1999.

In the European Parliament, he was also a member of the Subcommittee on Human Rights, a substitute for the Committee on Regional Development, vice-chair of the ACP-EU Joint Parliamentary Assembly and a substitute for the delegation for relations with the countries of Central America.

Vergès died the night of 11/12 November 2016, at the age of 91. His twin brother was the lawyer Jacques Vergès.
