= Communist Party of Réunion =

Communist Party of Réunion Parti communiste réunionnais
- Leader: Élie Hoarau
- Founded: 1959
- Ideology: Communism; Post-Marxism; Regionalism
- Political position: Left-wing
- National affiliation: New Popular Front (since 2024)
- European Parliament group: European United Left/Nordic Green Left (2009–2019)
- International affiliation: IMCWP
- Colours: Red
- National Assembly: 0 / 577
- Senate: 0 / 348
- European Parliament: 0 / 74
- Regional Council of Réunion: 3 / 45
- Departmental Council of Réunion: 4 / 50
- Mayors of Réunion: 1 / 24

Website
- http://particommunistereunionnais.com/

The Reunionese Communist Party (French: Parti communiste réunionnais, [paʁti kɔmynist ʁeynjɔnɛ], PCR) is a communist political party in the French overseas department of Réunion (in the Indian Ocean).

== History ==
PCR was founded in 1959, as the French Communist Party (PCF) federation in Reunion became an independent party. In the same year, they decided to include demands for autonomy in their manifesto. The party said that it wanted autonomy but not independence. It has since abandoned its policy of autonomism. Paul Vergès led the party from its foundation until February 1993, when he stepped down and Élie Hoarau was elected general secretary.

During the late 1990s the relations between PCF and PCR became somewhat strained, regarding differences in party lines. Relations were, however, fully restored in 2005, on the occasion of PCF leader Marie-George Buffet's visit to the island; subsequently, the PCR stood on the list of the French Communist Party in the 2004 European Parliament elections, and Vergès became one of three MEPs elected from the PCF list at national level. The main party leaders are Hoarau, Huguette Bello and Pierre Vergès (the son of Paul Vergès).

The press outlet of the party is the daily newspaper Témoignages, founded by Paul Vergès' father, Dr. Raymond Vergès, in 1944. Temoignages has headquarters in Le Port, where the Communist Party usually gets most of their votes.

In 2012, Pour La Réunion was created by Huguette Bello as a splinter party.

== Important members ==
=== National Secretary ===
- Élie Hoarau

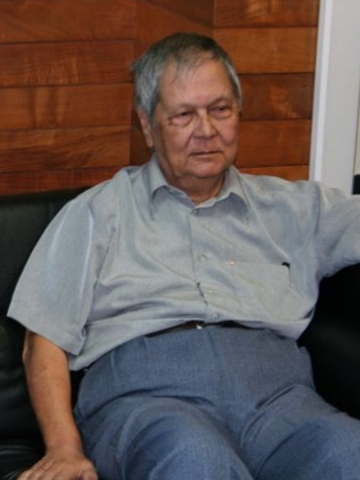
Paul Vergès

=== Senators ===
- Paul Vergès (2011–2016)
- Gélita Hoarau (wife of Élie Hoarau) (2005–2011, 2016–2017)

=== Deputies ===
- Huguette Bello (1997)

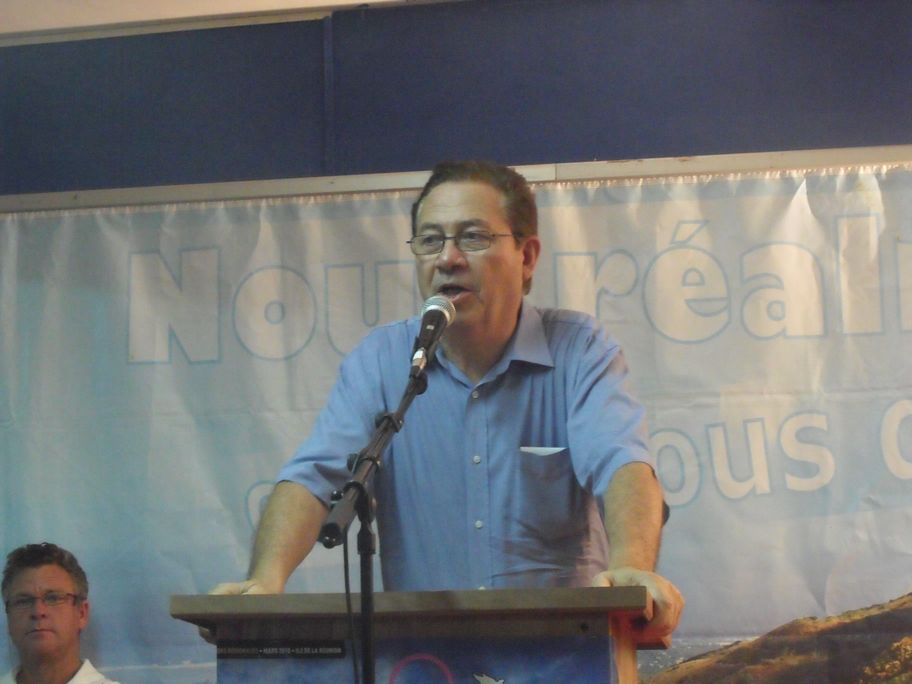
Claude Hoarau

=== Mayors ===
- Huguette Bello (Saint-Paul, 2008–2014)
- Claude Hoarau (Saint-Louis)
- Roland Robert (La Possession)
- Yolande Pausé (Sainte-Suzanne)
- Éric Fruteau (Saint-André)
- Jean-Yves Langenier (Le Port)

=== Regional Councillors ===
- Paul Vergès
- Maya Cesari (stepdaughter of Paul Vergès )
- Yasmina Panshbaya
- Élie Hoarau
- Rahiba Dubois
- Catherine Gaud
- Aline Hoarau Murin
- Béatrice Leperlier
- Philippe Jean-Pierre

=== Departemental Councillors ===
- Maurice Gironcel
- Roland Ramakistin
- Yvon Virapin
- Robert Nativel
- Yvon Bello
- Éric Fruteau
- Monica Govindin
- Jean-Yves Langenier
- Roland Robert
- Pierre Vergès (son of Paul Vergès)

== See also ==
- Marxist–Leninist Communist Organisation of Réunion
