= Politics of Réunion =

Réunion is an overseas département of France.

The island's conventional name is the Department of Réunion, or Réunion. The French flag is used on the island. The island's capital is Saint-Denis, and the island is divided into 4 arrondissements, 24 communes and 25 cantons.

Réunion is governed by French law under Article 73 of the Constitution of France, under which the laws and regulations are applicable as of right, as in metropolitan France. Suffrage is granted universally to all those over the age of 18.

== Executive branch ==
The chief of state is the French President Emmanuel Macron, who is represented by Prefect Jacques Billant. The President of the Regional Council is Huguette Bello. The president of the Departmental Council is Cyrille Melchior.

Elections held in Réunion include the French presidential vote. A prefect is appointed by the president on the advice of the French Ministry of the Interior. The presidents of the General and Regional Councils are elected by members of those councils.

== Legislative branch ==
The regional council has 45 seats, and exercises the powers of a French region and certain specific powers of an overseas region.

The departmental council has 50 seats, and exercises departmental powers.

=== Regional Council composition ===
Party	Seats
Majority (29 seats)
Miscellaneous left	10
For Réunion	6
Communist Party of Réunion	3
La France Insoumise	2
Socialist Party	2
Banian	2
Territories of Progress	1
Action Populaire de la Réunion	1
Mouvement citoyen réunionnais	1
Endemik Réunion	1
Opposition (16 seats)
Miscellaneous right	7
Objectif Réunion	4
The Republicans	2
Union of Democrats and Independents	1
France Réunion Avenir	1
Miscellaneous centre	1

=== Departmental Council composition ===
Party	Seats	Group
Majority (37 seats)
Miscellaneous right	13	Platform of the Union of the Right
The Republicans	11	Platform of the Union of the Right
Union of Democrats and Independents	6	Platform of the Union of the Right
Objectif Réunion	3	Platform of the Union of the Right
Miscellaneous right	4	Tampon avenir
Opposition (13 seats)
Socialist Party	5	The United Left
For Réunion	2	The United Left
Ecology Generation	1	The United Left
Communist Party of Réunion	3	Together for Sustainable and United Development
Democratic Movement	2	Politics Differently

=== Deputies ===
Réunion elects seven deputies to the National Assembly for five-year terms.

Constituency	Deputy	Party
1st	Philippe Naillet	PS
2nd	Karine Lebon	PLR
3rd	Joseph Rivière	RN
4th	Emeline K/Bidi	LP
5th	Jean-Hugues Ratenon	RÉ974
6th	Frédéric Maillot	PLR
7th	Perceval Gaillard	RÉ974

=== Senators ===
Réunion elects four senators to the Senate for six-year terms.

Senator	Party
Viviane Malet	LR
Stéphane Fouassin	UDI
Audrey Bélim	PS
Evelyne Corbière	PLR

=== European Parliament ===
Réunion participates in French elections to the European Parliament. It was formerly a part of the Indian Ocean section of the Overseas constituency, before France reverted to a single constituency in 2019.

== Judicial branch ==
The Judicial branch of the overseas département is run by the Cour d'Appel (Court of Appeals).

== International organization participation ==
Reunion is a member in the Indian Ocean Commission (InOC) since 1986, and of the World Federation of Trade Unions.

== See also ==
- Elections in Réunion
- Regional Council of Réunion
