= Results of the 2024 French legislative election in La Réunion =

Following the first round of the 2024 French legislative election on 30 June 2024, runoff elections in each constituency where no candidate received a vote share greater than 50 percent were scheduled for 7 July. Candidates permitted to stand in the runoff elections needed to either come in first or second place in the first round or achieve more than 12.5 percent of the votes of the entire electorate (as opposed to 12.5 percent of the vote share due to low turnout).

== La Réunion ==
=== 1st constituency ===
Candidate	Party or alliance		First round		Second round	
Candidate	Party or alliance		Votes	%	Votes	%
Philippe Naillet	New Popular Front	Socialist Party	19,186	46.25	27,276	64.72
Jean-Jacques Morel	National Rally		11,451	27.60	14,868	35.28
René-Paul Victoria	The Republicans		5,670	13.67		
Ludovic Sautron	Ecologists	Independent	2,126	5.13		
Gaëlle Lebon	Reconquête		1,693	4.08		
Gino Ponin Ballom	Miscellaneous right	Independent	699	1.69		
Paul Techer	Far-left	Lutte Ouvrière	450	1.08		
Nadine Mitra	Independent		148	0.36		
Krishna Sawoo	Independent		59	0.14		
Total			41,482	100.00	42,144	100.00
Valid votes			41,482	95.53	42,144	93.47
Invalid votes			809	1.86	1,087	2.41
Blank votes			1,134	2.61	1,858	4.12
Total votes			43,425	100.00	45,089	100.00
Registered voters/turnout			88,547	49.04	88,571	50.91

=== 2nd constituency ===
Candidate	Party or alliance		First round		Second round	
Candidate	Party or alliance		Votes	%	Votes	%
Karine Lebon	New Popular Front	Pour La Réunion	19,068	47.72	28,500	67.46
Christelle Bègue	National Rally		8,513	21.31	13,749	32.54
Erick Fontaine	Independent		6,406	16.03		
Jean-Yves Morel	Miscellaneous right	Independent	3,415	8.55		
Claude Moutouallaguin	Reconquête		750	1.88		
Alix Mera	Sovereigntist right	Independent	699	1.75		
Nelly Actif	Far-left	Lutte Ouvrière	617	1.54		
Fabienne Faldon	Independent		489	1.22		
Total			39,957	100.00	42,249	100.00
Valid votes			39,957	93.22	42,249	91.98
Invalid votes			1,401	3.27	1,664	3.62
Blank votes			1,504	3.51	2,019	4.40
Total votes			42,862	100.00	45,932	100.00
Registered voters/turnout			101,743	42.13	101,744	45.14

=== 3rd constituency ===
Candidate	Party or alliance		First round		Second round	
Candidate	Party or alliance		Votes	%	Votes	%
Joseph Rivière	National Rally		13,360	31.56	22,831	51.43
Alexis Chaussalet	New Popular Front	La France Insoumise	10,076	23.80	21,559	48.57
Nathalie Bassire	Miscellaneous right	The Republicans	9,718	22.96		
Monique Benard	Miscellaneous right	Independent	4,207	9.94		
Jean-Jacques Vlody	Miscellaneous left	Socialist Party (Note: Dissident who ran without the support of the New Popular Front)	2,121	5.01		
Didier Hoareau	Far-right	Independent	2,083	4.92		
Nicolas Legentil	Far-left	Lutte Ouvrière	540	1.28		
Jean-Eric Theine	Sovereigntist right	Independent	229	0.54		
Antoine Fontaine	Regionalists	Independent	0	0.00		
Total			42,334	100.00	44,390	100.00
Valid votes			42,334	93.34	44,390	90.93
Invalid votes			1,529	3.37	2,044	4.19
Blank votes			1,490	3.29	2,385	4.89
Total votes			45,353	100.00	48,819	100.00
Registered voters/turnout			98,835	45.89	98,871	49.38

=== 4th constituency ===
Candidate	Party or alliance		First round		Second round	
Candidate	Party or alliance		Votes	%	Votes	%
Emeline Kbidi	New Popular Front	Le Progrès	22,696	42.28	32,405	60.59
Jonathan Rivière	National Rally		14,797	27.57	21,075	39.41
David Lorion	Miscellaneous right	Independent	13,171	24.54		
Imrhane Moullan	Miscellaneous right	Independent	1,594	2.97		
Serge Latchoumanin	Far-left	Lutte Ouvrière	1,189	2.21		
Martine Dijoux	Sovereigntist right	Independent	233	0.43		
Total			53,680	100.00	53,480	100.00
Valid votes			53,680	94.22	53,480	92.01
Invalid votes			1,718	3.02	2,286	3.93
Blank votes			1,577	2.77	2,359	4.06
Total votes			56,975	100.00	58,125	100.00
Registered voters/turnout			111,483	51.11	111,500	52.13

=== 5th constituency ===
Candidate	Party or alliance		First round		Second round	
Candidate	Party or alliance		Votes	%	Votes	%
Jean-Hugues Ratenon	New Popular Front	Rézistans Égalité 974	11,536	33.18	20,285	53.75
Joan Doro	National Rally		10,456	30.07	17,456	46.25
Anne Chane-Kaye-Bone	Miscellaneous left	Independent	5,757	16.56		
Léopoldine Settama-Vidon	Miscellaneous centre	Independent	3,655	10.51		
Jean-Yves Payet	Far-left	Lutte Ouvrière	989	2.84		
Jérémy Laup	Independent		800	2.30		
Alexandrine Duchemane Araye	Miscellaneous left	Independent	443	1.27		
Jean-Dominique Ramassamy	Miscellaneous right	Independent	413	1.19		
Dominique Sautron	Reconquête		300	0.86		
Lydia Picard	Independent		287	0.83		
Jean-Paul Limbe	Independent		132	0.38		
Total			34,768	100.00	37,741	100.00
Valid votes			34,768	94.25	37,741	93.02
Invalid votes			1,168	3.17	1,582	3.90
Blank votes			955	2.59	1,252	3.09
Total votes			36,891	100.00	40,575	100.00
Registered voters/turnout			90,636	40.70	90,674	44.75

=== 6th constituency ===
Candidate	Party or alliance		First round		Second round	
Candidate	Party or alliance		Votes	%	Votes	%
Frédéric Maillot	New Popular Front	Pour La Réunion	10,818	29.76	21,974	58.23
Valérie Legros	National Rally		9,790	26.93	15,764	41.77
Alexandre Lai Kane Cheong	Miscellaneous left	Independent	9,083	24.99		
Nadia Ramassamy	Ensemble	Renaissance	3,667	10.09		
Mario Lechat	Miscellaneous right	Independent	1,688	4.64		
Johny Adekalom	Miscellaneous centre	Independent	581	1.60		
Didier Lombard	Far-left	Lutte Ouvrière	475	1.31		
Marie-Christine Pounia	Reconquête		250	0.69		
Total			36,352	100.00	37,738	100.00
Valid votes			36,352	95.36	37,738	93.75
Invalid votes			914	2.40	1,198	2.98
Blank votes			854	2.24	1,319	3.28
Total votes			38,120	100.00	40,255	100.00
Registered voters/turnout			84,755	44.98	84,791	47.48

=== 7th constituency ===
Candidate	Party or alliance		First round		Second round	
Candidate	Party or alliance		Votes	%	Votes	%
Perceval Gaillard	New Popular Front	Rézistans Égalité 974	14,851	29.55	29,190	57.33
Jean-Luc Poudroux	National Rally		12,853	25.57	21,725	42.67
Thierry Robert	Miscellaneous centre	Independent	11,083	22.05		
Cyrille Hamilcaro	Miscellaneous right	Independent	3,754	7.47		
Karim Juhoor	Miscellaneous left	Independent	2,854	5.68		
Isaline Tronc	Miscellaneous left	Independent	2,651	5.27		
Jean-Luc Payet	Far-left	Lutte Ouvrière	724	1.44		
Nathalie de Boisvilliers	Reconquête		551	1.10		
Richelain Catherine	Independent		479	0.95		
Sandrine Moukine	Sovereigntist right	Independent	461	0.92		
Total			50,261	100.00	50,915	100.00
Valid votes			50,261	93.32	50,915	90.28
Invalid votes			1,792	3.33	2,625	4.65
Blank votes			1,806	3.35	2,858	5.07
Total votes			53,859	100.00	56,398	100.00
Registered voters/turnout			121,146	44.46	121,201	46.53
