= Huguette Bello =

French politician

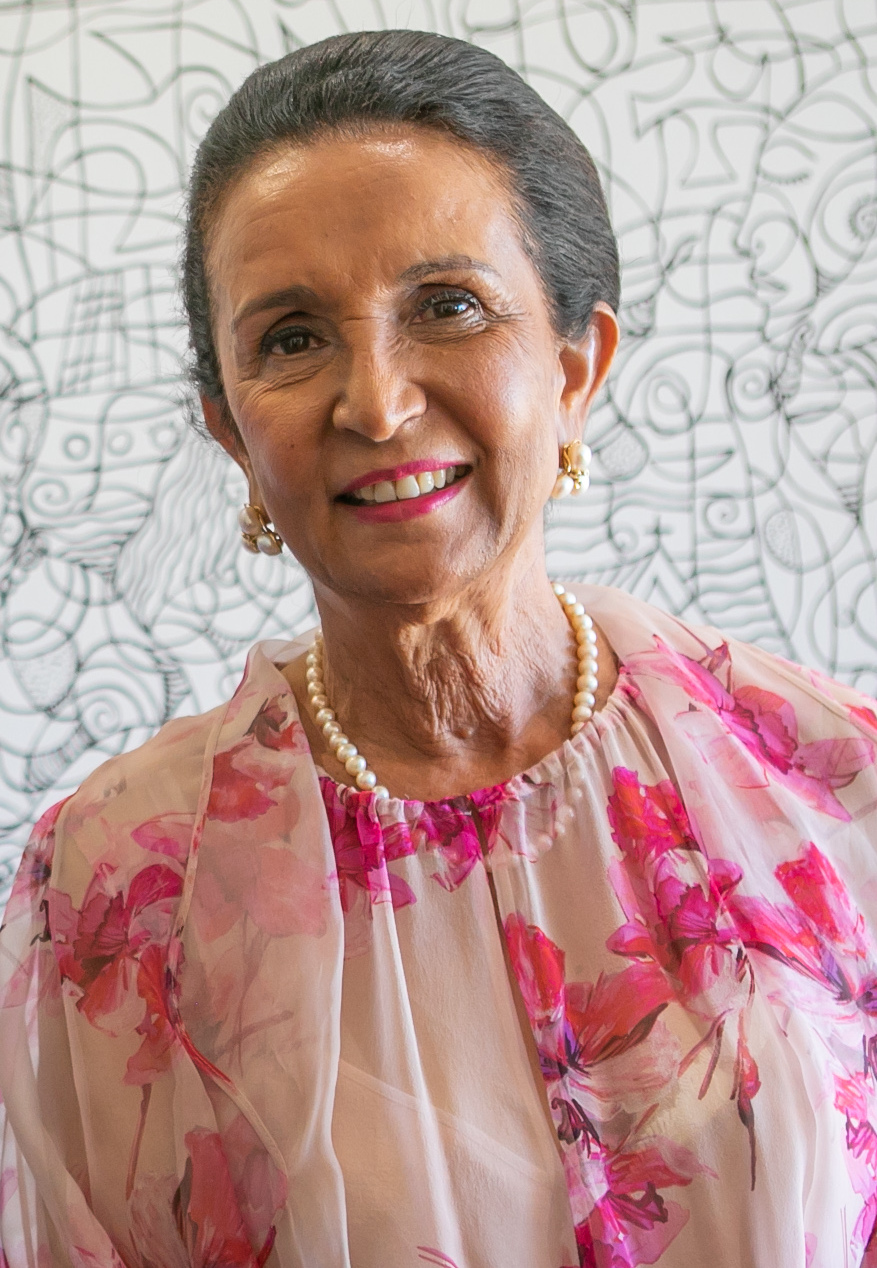
- Bello in 2023

President of the Regional Council of Réunion
- Incumbent
- Assumed office 2 July 2021
- Preceded by: Didier Robert

President of For Réunion
- Incumbent
- Assumed office 13 May 2012
- Preceded by: Party established

Mayor of Saint-Paul
- In office 4 July 2020 – 8 July 2021
- Preceded by: Joseph Sinimalé
- Succeeded by: Emmanuel Séraphin
- In office 9 October 2009 – 6 April 2014
- Preceded by: Special delegation
- Succeeded by: Joseph Sinimalé
- In office 21 March 2008 – 20 August 2009
- Preceded by: Alain Bénard
- Succeeded by: Special delegation

Member of the National Assembly for Réunion's 2nd constituency
- In office 12 June 1997 – 7 July 2020
- Preceded by: Claude Hoarau
- Succeeded by: Olivier Hoarau

Regional Councillor of Réunion
- Incumbent
- Assumed office 18 December 2015
- President: Didier Robert; Herself
- In office 27 March 1992 – 1 March 1993
- President: Camille Sudre

Departmental Councillor of Réunion
- In office 7 October 1988 – 27 March 1994
- Constituency: Canton of Saint-Pierre-3

Personal details
- Born: Marie-Huguette Antoinette Bello; 24 August 1950 (age 76) Saint-Pierre, Réunion, France
- Party: For Réunion (2012–present)
- Other political affiliations: Reunionese Communist Party (1974–2012)
- Spouse(s): Jean-Marie Wisniowycki (divorced); Roland Malet
- Children: 2
- Occupation: Politician; teacher

Marie-Huguette Antoinette Bello (French pronunciation: [maʁi yɡɛt ɑ̃twanɛt bɛlo]; born 24 August 1950) is a French politician and teacher from Réunion who has served as president of the Regional Council of Réunion since 2021. Bello is the founder of the left-wing For Réunion political party, having previously been a member of the Reunionese Communist Party (PCR) until the foundation of For Réunion in 2012.

After working as a substitute teacher and preschool principal in Réunion, Bello entered politics in 1983, joining the municipal government of Saint-Pierre, and later the municipal government of La Possession in 1989. In 1988, Bello was elected to the Departmental Council of Réunion in the 1988 election, before returning to the Saint-Pierre municipal government in 1995. Bello entered national politics after being elected to the National Assembly for Réunion's 2nd constituency in the 1997 legislative election. Bello was reelected in the 2002, 2007, 2012, and 2017 elections, until resigning her seat in 2020 due to laws regarding dual mandates. Bello was first elected mayor of Saint-Paul in the 2008 municipal elections, and served intermittently as mayor between 2008 and 2021.

Bello was chosen to lead the left-wing electoral alliance in Réunion into the 2015 regional election, but was defeated by incumbent Didier Robert. She led the alliance once again in the 2021 regional election, and this time was victorious, becoming the president of the Regional Council of Réunion.

Following the 2024 legislative election, several leaders of the left-wing New Popular Front coalition proposed Bello as the coalition's candidate for prime minister of France. The Socialist Party later chose not to endorse her and she stated that she would no longer pursue the coalition's nomination.

== Early life and education ==
Bello was born on 24 August 1950 in Saint-Pierre, the third most-populous city of the French overseas region of Réunion. Her parents Husto and Céline Bello had six children, of which she was their only daughter. Her father worked on a plantation, while her mother was a homemaker. The family resided in the Ravine des Cabris neighborhood of Saint-Pierre. Bello was raised in a practicing Roman Catholic family, and continues to attend weekly mass regularly.

Bello was educated at Lycée Roland Garros in Le Tampon, and initially aspired to become a lawyer before pursuing a career in education. After turning 18, Bello became a substitute teacher to support her family financially, and later worked as a preschool principal in Saint-Leu, Saint-Louis, and Le Port in the 1980s. She became political after joining the Union of Women of La Réunion in 1978, of which she was elected president. She later also joined the Front de la Jeunesse autonomiste de La Réunion and the Communist Party of Réunion. In 1981, she attended the Women's International Democratic Federation in Czechoslovakia, where she met former First Lady of Chile Hortensia Bussi, the first female astronaut Valentina Tereshkova, and the South African activist Dulcie September, which influenced her to pursue politics on her own.

== Political career ==
Bello began her career in politics in 1983 with the Communist Party of Réunion, after becoming a deputy mayor of Saint-Pierre. She remained in the position until 1989, when she became a deputy mayor of La Possession. She was later elected to the Departmental Council of Réunion in the 1988 election, and served until returning to the municipal council of Saint-Pierre following the 1995 municipal elections.

=== Member of the National Assembly ===
In 1997, Bello was selected to stand as a candidate for the Communist Party in the 1997 legislative election, standing in Réunion's 2nd constituency. She ultimately was elected to the National Assembly, making history as the first woman to be elected to French parliament from Réunion. She was reelected in the 2002 and 2007 legislative elections, defeating Alain Bénard of the center-right Union for a Popular Movement (UMP) both times.

After taking her seat in parliament, Bello joined the left-wing Radical, Citizen, and Green parliamentary group, before sitting as a non-attached member in her second term. In 2007, Bello joined the Democratic and Republican Left group. As a member of parliament, Bello focused on issues related to education and professional development, and launched plans to develop a maritime lycée professionnel in Réunion.

In the 2012 presidential election, Bello endorsed François Hollande of the Socialist Party. Ahead of the 2012 legislative election, Bello was asked by the Communist Party to abandon her constituency and instead stand for election in Réunion's 7th constituency. She rejected the party's request and was subsequently expelled from the party. As a result, she founded the For Réunion political party and was reelected in the 2nd constituency, defeating the Communist Party candidate in the first round with 67% of the vote, avoiding a runoff. She later joined the Left Front political alliance. In 2013, as a member of parliament, Bello abstained from the parliamentary vote on legalizing same-sex marriage; however, she later celebrated the first same-sex marriage performed in Réunion later that year, in her capacity as mayor of Saint-Paul. In 2016, Bello was one of 56 members of parliament who signed the leftist motion of no confidence against the El Khomri law.

Bello endorsed Jean-Luc Mélenchon in the 2017 presidential election, and was reelected to the National Assembly in the 2017 legislative election with the support of the Communist Party, Rézistans Égalité 974, and La France Insoumise (LFI). She received 57.1% of the vote in the first round, but was not permitted to be elected outright due to the low voter participation rate, and was later elected in the runoff with 73.6% of the vote. In the aftermath of the election, following the general policy proposal of prime minister Édouard Philippe and his government, Bello voted against confidence in the government. The following year, she joined other left-wing opposition groups in supporting a motion of no confidence in the aftermath of the Benalla affair.

In March 2018, Bello visited the Cimendef Media Library in Saint-Paul with Ericka Bareigts, which was recently purchased by the regional government of Réunion. Bello and Bareigts were refused access to part of the building, and subsequently forced their way in with the Cimendef Collective. The Réunion regional government subsequently filed a trespassing complaint against Bello and Bareigts, which the media referred to as the Cimendef affair. In September 2018, Bello and Bareigts were acquitted by the Saint-Denis criminal court, and the regional government appealed the acquittal.

In 2020, Bello resigned her seat in the National Assembly following her election as mayor of Saint-Paul, due to new legislation regarding the accumulation of dual mandates. Following her resignation, she was replaced by her deputy Olivier Hoarau, who soon afterwards also resigned in order to maintain his municipal offices. A by-election was then organized to elect a replacement, won by Karine Lebon, supported by For Réunion, the Communist Party, the Socialist Party, and LFI.

=== Mayor of Saint-Paul ===
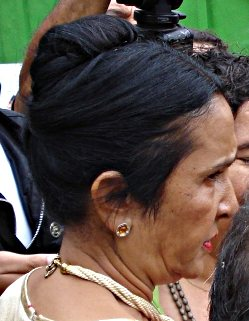
Bello in 2011

During the 2008 municipal election, Bello led a left-wing list in Saint-Paul, which went on to win the election after receiving 50.2% of the vote in the second round runoff, defeating outgoing mayor Alain Bénard. Following the election, Bello was inaugurated as mayor of Saint-Paul, the second most-populous city in Réunion. Upon her election, Bello became the second woman in Réunion to ever be elected as a mayor, following Marie-Thérèse de Chateauvieux of Saint-Leu, and one of the few women in France to be elected as mayor of a city with over 100,000 residents. Bénard, having been beaten by just 138 votes, alleged that Bello's list had illegally distributed leaflets to voters the day before the election, in addition to alleging "maneuvers" on the voting lists and "pressuring" at polling places. Bénard appealed the election results at the administrative court of Saint-Denis, which decided to invalidate the results. Bello appealed the court's decision before the Conseil d'État, but her appeal was rejected in August 2009, resulting in the organization of new elections and her removal from the office of mayor. In the interim, the municipal government was led by a special delegation appointed by the prefect of Réunion. New municipal elections were held in the city in October 2009, where Bello once again defeated Bénard and was able to become reinaugurated as mayor.

As mayor, Bello was forced to respond to numerous incidents of shark attacks on Saint-Paul beaches, particularly following the death of a man following a shark attack in September 2011. The victim's family criticized Bello for her response to the attack, which led to widespread discussion and controversy regarding discrimination against Zoreilles in Réunion. Bello later lost reelection as mayor in the 2014 municipal election, being defeated by the right-wing list of Joseph Sinimalé.

In July 2019, Bello announced that she would again be running in the 2020 municipal election in Saint-Paul, and was supported by a coalition of the left-wing, including the Communist Party, Socialist Party, The Ecologists, LFI, and the Left Party. She went on to easily win the first round of voting with 36.6% of the vote, ahead of incumbent mayor Sinimalé of The Republicans with 19.9% and former mayor Bénard with 14.6%. In the second round runoff, Bello was once again elected mayor after securing 61.8% of the vote. Upon taking office as mayor for a second term, Bello supported a reduction in the salaries of municipal councillors, which the previous administration had increased. The following year, she introduced free school meals for students in the city, the creation of a police station in the rural inland area of the city, the revision of the city's urban planning scheme and deployment of video surveillance by 2026, and the implementation of a policy which would recruit public sector employees with disabilities.

Bello resigned as mayor of Saint-Paul in 2021, following her election as president of the Regional Council of Réunion, and she was replaced by her first deputy mayor Emmanuel Séraphin.

=== President of the Regional Council of Réunion ===
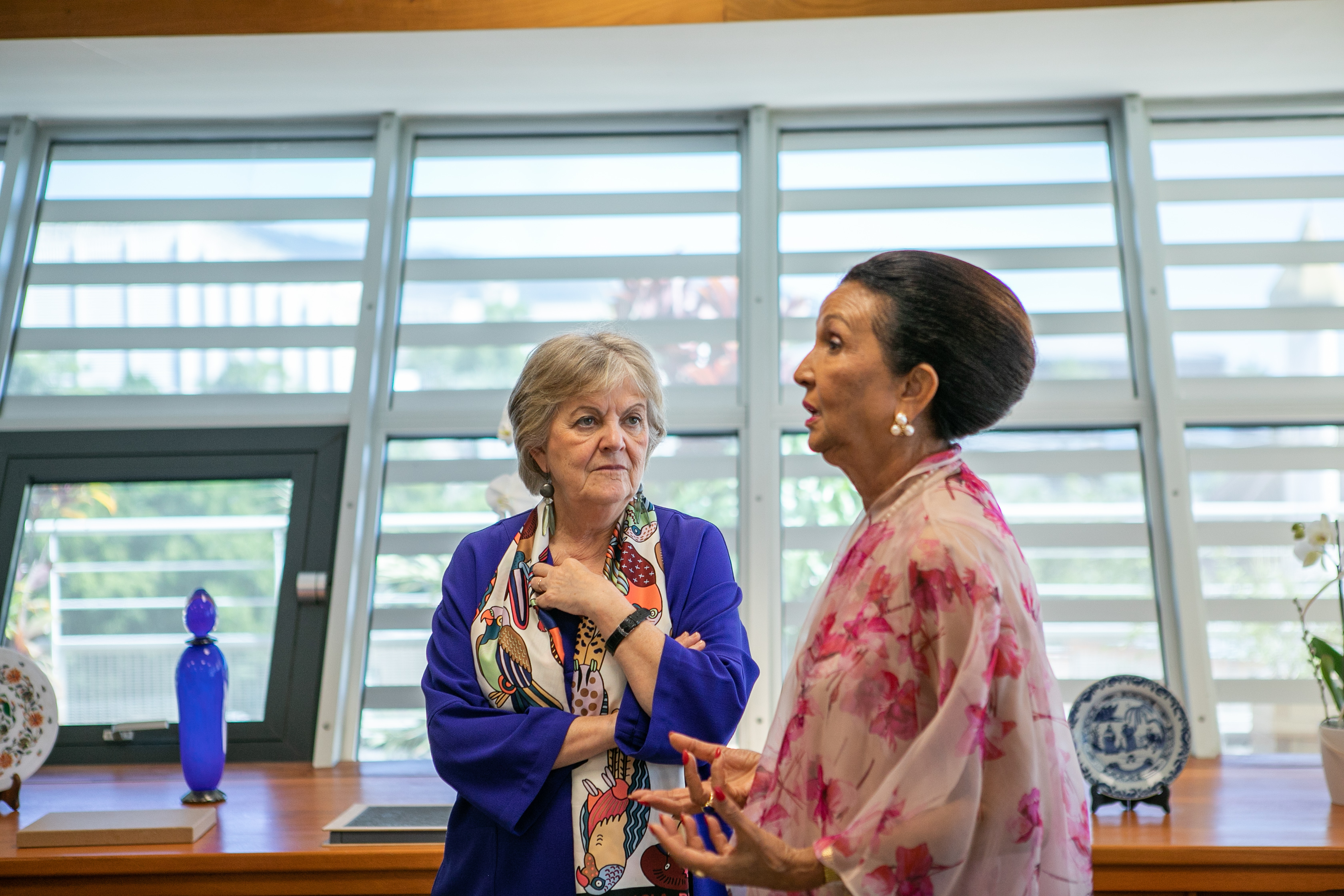
Bello (right) with Elisa Ferreira in 2023

In 2015, Bello was chosen to lead the left-wing alliance in Réunion into the 2015 regional election, making her the left's candidate for president of the Regional Council of Réunion. Her list went on to place second in the first round with 23.8% of the vote, behind incumbent Didier Robert of The Republicans with 40.4% of the vote. In the second round runoff, Bello negotiated an alliance between her list and Thierry Robert of the centrist Democratic Movement and the center-left Patrick Lebreton, but she placed second with 47.3% of the vote, losing to Robert. Following the conclusion of the election, Bello took her seat in the Regional Council and began to focus on regional politics, resigning her seat in the Saint-Paul municipal council, where she had been in the opposition since her defeat in the 2014 municipal election.

Bello once again led the left-wing in the 2021 regional election as their presidential candidate in Réunion, campaigning on a platform of fighting against inequalities and granting free access to the car jaune bus system in Réunion. In the first round, Bello once again placed second behind incumbent Robert, receiving 20.7% of the vote to Robert's 31.1%, and both ahead of Ericka Bareigts of the Socialist Party with 18.5%. In the second round runoff, Bello negotiated a united left electoral alliance with Bareigts, and went on to defeat Robert after receiving 51.9% of the final vote. Her election resulted in Réunion becoming the only region to flip from right-wing to left-wing in the 2021 regional elections.

Upon taking office as president of the regional council, Bello became the second woman to serve in the position, following Margie Sudre. As president, she also took office as vice-president of the Régions de France association, an association of the regional heads of government in France. In 2022, she was elected to the supervisory board of the University Hospital of La Réunion for a five-year term.

Much like in 2017, Bello endorsed Mélenchon in the 2022 French presidential election, and also supported the left-wing New Ecological and Social People's Union (NUPES) electoral alliance in the 2022 legislative election. Her party For Réunion aligned itself with LFI, the Socialist Party, and The Ecologists to form the Rassemblement réunionnais, which served as the counterpart to NUPES in Réunion. In the event of a NUPES victory in the election and a left-wing government coming into power in parliament, Bello was discussed by the media as a potential minister in a government led by Mélenchon. In the 2024 European Parliament election in France, Bello was given a symbolic position on the list of LFI, being placed in the unelectable last position, just behind Mélenchon.

Following the victory of the left-wing New Popular Front (NFP) in the 2024 legislative election, Bello was cited by members of the coalition as a potential future candidate for prime minister of France. She was proposed as the coalition's candidate for prime minister by Fabien Roussel of the French Communist Party, which was later supported by LFI and The Ecologists as well. Bello's suggested nomination received some criticism for her past abstention from the vote on the legalization of same-sex marriage in 2013, and the Socialist Party later announced that they would not endorse her candidacy. Afterwards, Bello stated that she would no longer pursue the coalition's nomination for prime minister.

== Personal life ==
Bello was first married to Jean-Marie Wisniowycki, from whom she is divorced. She later married Roland Malet, a journalist who previously worked for Les Echos and RFO Réunion. Bello has two children.
