= Olivier Hoarau =

French politician

Mayor of Le Port
- Incumbent
- Assumed office 4 April 2014
- Preceded by: Jean-Yves Langenier

Regional Councillor for Réunion
- In office 5 December 2018 – 27 June 2021
- President: Didier Robert

Member of the National Assembly for Réunion's 2nd constituency
- In office 8 July 2020 – 8 July 2020
- Preceded by: Huguette Bello
- Succeeded by: Karine Lebon

Personal details
- Born: 31 March 1975 (age 51)
- Party: For Réunion (until 2021)
- Occupation: Politician

Olivier Hoarau (March 31, 1975) is a French politician.

A member of the For Réunion (PLR) party until 2021, he has been mayor of Le Port since 2014 and was elected deputy for La Réunion in 2020.

== Biography ==
Olivier Hoarau, who was the substitute for Huguette Bello in the legislative elections of 2012 and then in 2017, was elected mayor of Le Port (La Réunion) for the first time on April 4, 2014, after his list "Cap vers le renouveau" (English: Towards Renewal), obtained 55.3% of the votes in the second round of the municipal elections.

As the 18th candidate on Huguette Bello's list in the regional elections of 2015 in La Réunion, he joined the regional council in December 2018, replacing Monique Bénard, who had resigned.

During the municipal elections of 2020, his list won outright in the first round with 58.3% of the votes, securing his re-election as mayor on May 26. Following the resignation of Huguette Bello from the National Assembly, who was elected mayor of Saint-Paul, he became a deputy for the second constituency of La Réunion on July 8, 2020, but immediately resigned to remain mayor of Le Port. However, according to the law stating that the most recent mandate obtained (in his case, that of a deputy) takes precedence, Olivier Hoarau resigned from his mayoral position at the same time and was re-elected by the municipal council of Le Port on July 15.

In October 2020, Olivier Hoarau announced his candidacy for the 2021 regional elections in La Réunion. On February 4, 2021, he was placed under investigation for corruption and money laundering related to the extension project of the Cap Sacré Cœur shopping center. He simultaneously left the party For Réunion and announced that he would continue his candidacy in the regional elections. He came in sixth place in the first round with 4.2% of the votes.

== See also ==
- Le Port, Réunion
