= Monique Orphé =

French politician

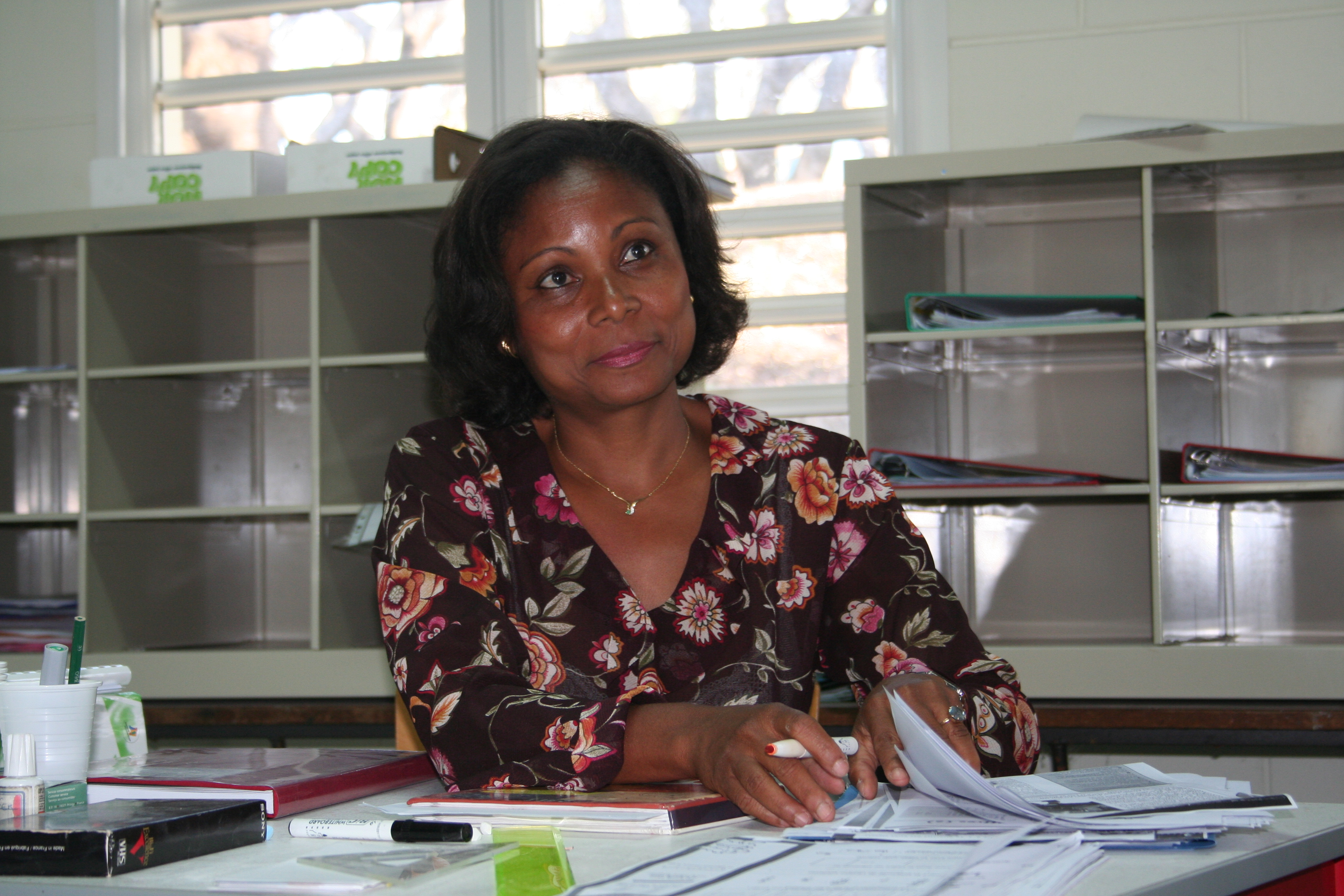
- Monique Orphé in 2006.

Departmental councillor of Réunion
- Incumbent
- Assumed office 1 July 2021 Serving with Gérard Françoise
- Preceded by: Nadia Ramassamy
- Constituency: Canton of Saint-Denis-1

Member of the National Assembly for Réunion's 6th constituency
- In office 20 June 2012 – 20 June 2017
- Preceded by: Constituency created
- Succeeded by: Nadia Ramassamy

Personal details
- Born: 15 October 1964 (age 61) Saint-Denis, Réunion
- Party: PS

Monique Orphé (born 15 October 1964 in Saint-Denis, Réunion) is a French politician. A member of the Socialist Party (PS), she was a Deputy in the National Assembly from Réunion between 2012 and 2017.

== Biography ==
Teacher by profession, Monique Orphé was elected to the Regional Council of Réunion in 2004.

Nominated as a candidate in Réunion's 1st constituency for the 2007 legislative election, with Gilbert Annette as her replacement, she withdrew her candidacy in favour of Annette. A municipal councillor of Saint-Denis since 1995, she became the first deputy mayor to Gilbert Annette following the 2008 municipal elections.

During the second round of the 2012 legislative election, she was elected Deputy of the newly created 6th constituency of Réunion with 58.9% of the vote. A member of the Social Affairs Committee, she supported the El Khomri law in 2016.

She supported Emmanuel Macron during the 2017 presidential election. As a result of her support for Macron, she was refused the nomination of the PS during the 2017 legislative election, which she lost during the second round to Nadia Ramassamy (LR).

A candidate during the 2021 departmental election in the Canton of Saint-Denis-1 with Gérard Françoise, she finished first in the first round with 54.6% of votes cast, but a high abstention rate didn't permit the pairing to be directly elected. The Socialist Party pairing went on to win the second round of voting with 56.3% of votes cast.
