= Jacqueline Farreyrol =

French singer, actress, songwriter and politician

Members of Parliament
- In office November 13, 2010 – September 30, 2011
- Preceded by: Didier Robert
- Succeeded by: Jean-Jacques Vlody

French Senator
- In office October 1, 2011 – June 30, 2014

Personal details
- Born: February 25, 1939 (age 87) Saint-Louis, Réunion, France
- Party: Union for a Popular Movement
- Occupation: Singer, actress, songwriter and politician

Jacqueline Farreyrol (born February 25, 1939, in Saint-Louis, Réunion, France) is a French singer, actress, songwriter and politician. A member of the UMP party, she was a Member of Parliament from 2010 to 2011 and a Senator from 2011 to 2014.

== Political career ==
During the 2002–2007 parliamentary term, Jacqueline Farreyrol was the deputy for René-Paul Victoria (UMP), the member of parliament elected for Réunion's 1st constituency.

Following the 2007 legislative elections, she became the deputy for Didier Robert (UMP), the MP elected in Réunion's 3rd constituency. On June 9, 2010, she was elected head of the IRT (Île de La Réunion Tourisme). On November 13, 2010, she became a member of parliament after Didier Robert extended his term of office.

On September 25, 2011, she was elected senator, giving up her seat as deputy. The following year, she resigned from her position as deputy mayor, which she had held since 2008, and from the municipal council of Le Tampon.

On June 6, 2014, she announced that she would be resigning from the Senate to "devote all her time and energy" to her family and "artistic career ". She is replaced in the Senate by Didier Robert.

== See also ==
- Réunion's 3rd constituency
- List of senators of Réunion
- Women in the French National Assembly
- Women in the French Senate
