= Réunion's 2nd constituency =

Constituency of French parliament

2nd constituency of Réunion
- inline Constituency of the National Assembly of France

- The constituency in Réunion
- Deputy: Karine Lebon; PLR
- Department: Réunion

The 2nd constituency of Réunion is a French legislative constituency on the island of Réunion, represented by Karine Lebon as of 2024.

== Deputies ==
1988	Laurent Vergès	PCR
1988	Alexis Pota	PCR
1993	Paul Vergès	PCR
1996	Claude Hoarau	PCR
1997	Huguette Bello	PCR
2002	Huguette Bello	PCR
2007	Huguette Bello	PCR
2012	Huguette Bello	PLR
2017	Huguette Bello	PLR
2020	Olivier Hoarau	PLR
2020	Karine Lebon	PLR
2022	Karine Lebon	PLR
2024	Karine Lebon	PLR

== Election results ==
=== 2024 ===
Candidate	Party	Alliance	First round		Second round	
Candidate	Party	Alliance	Votes	%	Votes	%
Karine Lebon	PLR	NFP	19,068	47.72	28,500	67.46
Christelle Begue	RN		8,513	21.31	13,749	32.54
Erick Fontaine	DIV		6,406	16.03		
Jean-Yves Morel	DVD		3,415	8.55		
Claude Moutouallaguin	REC		750	1.88		
Alix Mera	DSV		699	1.75		
Nelly Actif	LO		617	1.54		
Fabienne Faldon	DIV		489	1.22		
Valid votes			39,957	100.00	42,249	100.00
Blank votes			1,504	3.51	2,019	4.40
Null votes			1,401	3.27	1,664	3.62
Turnout			42,862	42.13	45,932	45.14
Abstentions			58,881	57.87	55,812	54.86
Registered voters			101,743		101,744	
Result			PLR HOLD			

=== 2022 ===
2022 legislative election in La-Reunion's 2nd constituency
Candidate	Party	First round		Second round	
Candidate	Party	Votes	%	Votes	%
Huguette Bello	PLR (NUPES)	10,091	42.89	18,164	69.39
Audrey Fontaine	UDI (UDC)	3,085	13.11	8,013	30.61
Erick Fontaine	REG	2,957	12.57		
Michèle Graja	RN	1,926	8.19		
Karine Infante	REG	1,183	5.03		
Vincent Defaud	GE	1,062	4.51		
Virginie Peron	REG	1,058	4.50		
Sullaiman Soilihi	DXG	668	2.84		
Alix Mera	DLF (UPF)	534	2.24		
Stéphane Chen-Tzu-Kuong	REC	467	1.99		
Nicolas Legentil	LO	231	0.98		
Véronique Ferrier	DVD	145	0.62		
Emmanuel Georgette	DIV	118	0.50		
Laurent-Philippe Hoarau	DIV	0	0.00		
Valid votes		23,525	93.05	26,177	90.66
Spoilt and null votes		1,758	6.95	1,697	9.34
Votes cast / turnout		25,283	25.55	28,874	29.17
Abstentions		73,673	74.45	70,114	70.83
Registered voters		98,956		98,988	

=== 2020 by-election ===
2020 by-election in La-Reunion's 2nd constituency
Candidate	Party	First round		Second round	
Candidate	Party	Votes	%	Votes	%
Huguette Bello	PLR-PCR-PS-LFI	7,069	52.15	12,177	71.96
Audrey Fontaine	DVD	2,145	15.83	4,746	28.04
Philippe Robert	PCR diss.	839	6.19		
Alain Bénard	LR	733	5.41		
Patrick Serveaux	DIV	650	4.80		
Jean-François Nativel	DIV	519	3.83		
Charles Moyac	EELV	441	3.25		
Laurence Lougnon	MoDem	268	1.98		
Michelle Lartin-Graja	RN	214	1.58		
Jacques Elie Dijoux	DVD	194	1.43		
Hary Grondin	DIV	191	1.41		
Davilla Verdun	DVD	153	1.13		
Rémy Massain	PRG	111	0.82		
Jean-Philippe Desby	DIV	27	0.20		
Valid votes		13,554	92.98	16,923	93.09
Spoilt and null votes		1,024	7.02	1,255	6.91
Votes cast / turnout		14,578	15.15	18,178	18.88
Abstentions		81,650	84.85	78,079	81.12
Registered voters		96,228		96,257	

=== 2017 ===
Candidate	Label	First round		Second round	
Candidate	Label	Votes	%	Votes	%
Huguette Bello	PLR	15,871	57.08	24,559	73.59
Cyrille Melchior	LR	5,663	20.37	8,815	26.41
Stéphane Randrianarivelo	MoDem	2,077	7.47		
Indiana Ouënne	FN	1,186	4.27		
Marie-Gertrude Carpanin	DVD	1,028	3.70		
Charles Moyac	ECO	1,027	3.69		
Alix Jean Mera	DVD	421	1.51		
Britt Boutboul	DIV	271	0.97		
Christophe Vigne	EXG	263	0.95		
Votes		27,807	100.00	33,374	100.00
Valid votes		27,807	93.21	33,374	91.60
Blank votes		989	3.32	1,404	3.85
Null votes		1,038	3.48	1,658	4.55
Turnout		29,834	32.18	36,436	39.30
Abstentions		62,876	67.82	56,274	60.70
Registered voters		92,710		92,710	
Source: Ministry of the Interior

=== 2012 ===
2012 legislative election in La-Reunion's 2nd constituency
Candidate	Party	First round	
Candidate	Party	Votes	%
Huguette Bello	PLR	25,734	67.14%
Jean-Yves Langenier	PCR	5,485	14.31%
Sandra Sinimale	UMP	2,820	7.36%
Laurence Lougnon	PS	1,164	3.04%
Nelly Buchle	MoDem	959	2.50%
Nila Minatchy	EELV	812	2.12%
Elie Taieb	FN	656	1.71%
Patrick Loiseau	FG	278	0.73%
Elizabeth Ducarouge	DLR	185	0.48%
Guillaume Kobéna	DVG	85	0.22%
Michelle Graja	DVD	83	0.22%
Mickaël Hoareau	LO	67	0.17%
Valid votes		38,328	96.11%
Spoilt and null votes		1,553	3.89%
Votes cast / turnout		39,881	47.46%
Abstentions		44,155	52.54%
Registered voters		84,036	100.00%

== Sources ==
- French Interior Ministry results website: "Résultats électoraux officiels en France" (in French).
