= Réunion's 5th constituency =

French legislative district

5th constituency of Réunion
- inline Constituency of the National Assembly of France

- The constituency in Réunion
- Deputy: Jean-Hugues Ratenon; RÉ974
- Department: Réunion

The 5th constituency of Réunion is a French legislative constituency on the island of Réunion. As of 2024, it is represented by Jean-Hugues Ratenon, a Rézistans Égalité 974 deputy; close to La France Insoumise.

== Deputies ==
Election	Member	Party
2002	Bertho Audifax	UMP
2007	Bertho Audifax	UMP
2012	Jean-Claude Fruteau	PS
2017	Jean-Hugues Ratenon	RÉ974
2022	Jean-Hugues Ratenon	RÉ974
2024	Jean-Hugues Ratenon	RÉ974

== Election results ==
=== 2024 ===
Candidate	Party	Alliance	First round		Second round	
Candidate	Party	Alliance	Votes	%	Votes	%
Jean-Hugues Ratenon	RÉ974	NFP	11,536	33.18	20,285	53.75
Joan Doro	RN		10,456	30.07	17,456	46.25
Anne Chane-Kaye-Bone	DVG		5,757	16.56		
Léopoldine Settama-Vidon	DVC		3,655	10.51		
Jean-Yves Payet	LO		989	2.84		
Jérémy Laup	DIV		800	2.30		
Alexandrine Duchemane Araye	DVG		443	1.27		
Jean Dominique Ramassamy	DVD		413	1.19		
Dominique Sautron	REC		300	0.86		
Lydia Picard	DIV		287	0.83		
Jean-Paul Limbé	DIV		132	0.38		
Valid votes			34,768	100.00	37,741	100.00
Blank votes			955	2.59	1,252	3.09
Null votes			1,168	3.19	1,582	3.90
Turnout			36,891	40.70	40,575	44.75
Abstentions			53,745	59.30	50,099	55.25
Registered voters			90,636		90,674	
Result			RÉ974 HOLD			

=== 2022 ===
Candidate	Label	First round		Second round	
Candidate	Label	Votes	%	Votes	%
Jean-Hugues Ratenon	RÉ974 (NUPES)	9,345	36.38	17,748	62.81
Ridwane Issa	DVG	4,286	16.69	10,510	37.19
Stéphane Fouassin	UDI (UDC)	3,754	14.62		
Laurent Virapoullé	LREM (ENS)	3,425	13.33		
Marie-Luce Brasier-Clain	RN	2,314	9.01		
Léopoldine Settama-Vidon	DVC	1,197	4.66		
Jean-Yves Payet	LO	709	2.76		
Didier Gauvin	PCR	388	1.51		
Martine Dijoux	LP (UPF)	267	1.04		
Votes		25,685	100.00	28,258	100.00
Valid votes		25,685	94.99	28,258	92.80
Blank votes		596	2.20	923	3.03
Null votes		760	2.81	1,269	4.17
Turnout		27,040	30.83	30,450	34.72
Abstentions		60,657	69.17	57,253	65.28
Registered voters		87,697		87,703	
Source: Ministry of the Interior

=== 2017 ===
Candidate	Label	First round		Second round	
Candidate	Label	Votes	%	Votes	%
Daniel Gonthier	LR	6,927	30.51	12,527	47.12
Jean-Hugues Ratenon	DVG	3,947	17.38	14,056	52.88
Léopoldine Settama-Vidon	REM	3,614	15.92		
Philippe Le Constant	PS	2,816	12.40		
Jean-Luc Julie	DVD	1,629	7.17		
Marie-Luce Brasier-Clain	FN	1,344	5.92		
Alicia Hayano	DVD	608	2.68		
Jean-Yves Payet	EXG	561	2.47		
Magaly Bassonville	DIV	439	1.93		
Fabien Dijoux	DIV	334	1.47		
Willy Tarkin	DVG	250	1.10		
Jean-Paul Hoareau	DIV	238	1.05		
Votes		22,707	100.00	26,583	100.00
Valid votes		22,707	91.38	26,583	90.52
Blank votes		991	3.99	1,167	3.97
Null votes		1,150	4.63	1,616	5.50
Turnout		24,848	29.88	29,366	35.31
Abstentions		58,325	70.12	53,807	64.69
Registered voters		83,173		83,173	
Source: Ministry of the Interior

=== 2012 ===
2012 legislative election in La-Reunion's 5th constituency
Candidate	Party	First round		Second round	
Candidate	Party	Votes	%	Votes	%
Jean-Claude Fruteau	PS	12,964	43.07%	22,854	67.74%
Stéphane Fouassin	NC	5,961	19.80%	10,886	32.26%
Eric Fruteau	PCR	5,375	17.86%		
Jean-Hugues Ratenon		3,775	12.54%		
Joseph Damour	FN	772	2.56%		
Jean-Yves Payet	LO	318	1.06%		
Guylène Clain	EELV	314	1.04%		
Priscilla Damour	DVG (ER)	232	0.77%		
Michel Allamele		203	0.67%		
Farida Tandrayen	MoDem	186	0.62%		
Valid votes		30,100	95.27%	33,740	93.13%
Spoilt and null votes		1,496	4.73%	2,489	6.87%
Votes cast / turnout		31,596	41.68%	36,229	47.80%
Abstentions		44,206	58.32%	39,569	52.20%
Registered voters		75,802	100.00%	75,798	100.00%

== Sources ==
- French Interior Ministry results website: "Résultats électoraux officiels en France" (in French).
