= Réunion's 6th constituency =

Constituency of the National Assembly of France

6th constituency of Réunion
- inline Constituency of the National Assembly of France

- The constituency in Réunion
- Deputy: Frédéric Maillot; PLR
- Department: Réunion
- Cantons: Saint-André-1, Saint-Denis-7, Saint-Denis-9, Sainte-Marie, Sainte-Suzanne
- Registered voters: 84,791

The 6th constituency of Réunion is a French legislative constituency on the island of Réunion. As of 2024, it is represented by Frédéric Maillot, a New Ecologic and Social People's Union deputy.

== Deputies ==
Deputies from the 6th constituency of Réunion elected to the National Assembly for the legislatures of the 5th Republic.
Legislature	Start of mandate	End of mandate	Deputy	Party	Notes
14th	20 June 2012	20 June 2017	Monique Orphé	PS	
15th	21 June 2017	21 June 2022	Nadia Ramassamy	LR	
16th	19 June 2022	9 June 2024	Frédéric Maillot	PLR	
17th	18 July 2024	Incumbent	Frédéric Maillot	PLR	

== Election results ==
=== 2024 ===
Candidate	Party	Alliance	First round		Second round	
Candidate	Party	Alliance	Votes	%	Votes	%
Frédéric Maillot	PLR	NFP	10,818	29.76	21,974	58.23
Valérie Legros	RN		9,790	26.93	15,764	41.77
Alexandre Laï-Kane-Cheong	DVG		9,083	24.99		
Nadia Ramassamy	RE	ENS	3,667	10.09		
Mario Lechat	DVD		1,688	4.64		
Johny Adekalom	DVC		581	1.60		
Didier Lombard	LO		475	1.31		
Marie Christine Pounia	REC		250	0.69		
Valid votes			36,352	100.00	37,738	100.00
Blank votes			854	2.24	1,319	3.28
Null votes			914	2.40	1,198	2.98
Turnout			38,120	44.98	40,255	47.48
Abstentions			46,635	55.02	44,536	52.52
Registered voters			84,755		84,791	
Result			PLR HOLD			

=== 2022 ===
Candidate	Label	First round		Second round	
Candidate	Label	Votes	%	Votes	%
Frédéric Maillot	PLR (NUPES)	5,429	23.88	12,659	52.99
Alexandre Laï-Kane-Cheong	DXG	3,862	16.99	11,229	47.01
Eric Leung	DVC (ENS)	3,262	14.35		
Monique Orphé	PS diss.	2,513	11.05		
Nadine Gironcel-Damour	PCR	2,505	11.02		
Valérie Legros	RN	1,997	8.78		
Nadia Ramassamy	LR (UDC)	1,802	7.93		
Johny Adekalom	DVC	372	1.64		
Philippe de Chazournes	DXG	298	1.31		
Ophélie Clain	LP (UPF)	268	1.18		
Jean-Noël Hoareau	DXG	221	0.97		
Didier Lombard	LO	208	0.91		
Loïc Fanfan	REG	0	0.00		
Votes		22,737	100.00	23,888	100.00
Valid votes		22,737	94.11	23,888	91.85
Blank votes		742	3.07	1,146	4.41
Null votes		680	2.81	973	9.74
Turnout		24,159	29.46	26,007	31.70
Abstentions		57,861	70.54	56,043	68.30
Registered voters		82,020		82,050	
Source: Ministry of the Interior

=== 2017 ===
Candidate	Label	First round		Second round	
Candidate	Label	Votes	%	Votes	%
Monique Orphé	REM	5,770	27.45	11,181	47.39
Nadia Ramassamy	LR	4,515	21.48	12,415	52.61
Gilles Leperlier	DVG	2,284	10.87		
Alexandre Laï-Kane-Cheong	DVG	2,040	9.70		
Pascal Hoareau	FI	1,510	7.18		
Élodie Martin-Charron	FN	1,207	5.74		
Didier Gopal	DVD	1,044	4.97		
Patricia Coutandy	DVG	547	2.60		
Grégoire Cordeboeuf	DVD	440	2.09		
Ravy Vellayoudom	DVD	418	1.99		
Johny Adekalom	DVG	399	1.90		
Yvette Duchemann	ECO	297	1.41		
Jean-Luc Payet	EXG	208	0.99		
Delia Moutin	ECO	142	0.68		
Aurélie Frut	DIV	128	0.61		
Geoffroy Grondin	DVD	72	0.34		
Votes		21,021	100.00	23,596	100.00
Valid votes		21,021	91.30	23,596	86.87
Blank votes		1,021	4.43	1,698	6.25
Null votes		982	4.27	1,868	6.88
Turnout		23,024	30.35	27,162	35.80
Abstentions		52,837	69.65	48,700	64.20
Registered voters		75,861		75,862	
Source: Ministry of the Interior

=== 2012 ===
2012 legislative election in La-Reunion's 6th constituency
Candidate	Party	First round		Second round	
Candidate	Party	Votes	%	Votes	%
Monique Orphe	PS	11,642	42.25%	18,805	58.85%
Jean-Louis Lagourgue	UMP	8,136	29.53%	13,147	41.15%
Maurice Gironcel	PCR	5,014	18.20%		
Joseph Grondin	FN	851	3.09%		
Yvette Duchemann	EELV	847	3.07%		
Emmanuel Lemagnen	MoDem	471	1.71%		
Pascal Hoareau	FG	400	1.45%		
Didier Lombard	LO	194	0.70%		
Valid votes		27,555	94.42%	31,952	93.20%
Spoilt and null votes		1,629	5.58%	2,333	6.80%
Votes cast / turnout		29,184	42.99%	34,285	50.51%
Abstentions		38,699	57.01%	33,593	49.49%
Registered voters		67,883	100.00%	67,878	100.00%

== Sources ==
- French Interior Ministry results website: "Résultats électoraux officiels en France" (in French).
