= Conservatoire botanique national de Mascarin =

National conservatory and botanical garden in Réunion, France

Coordinates: 21.1377°S 55.2953°E

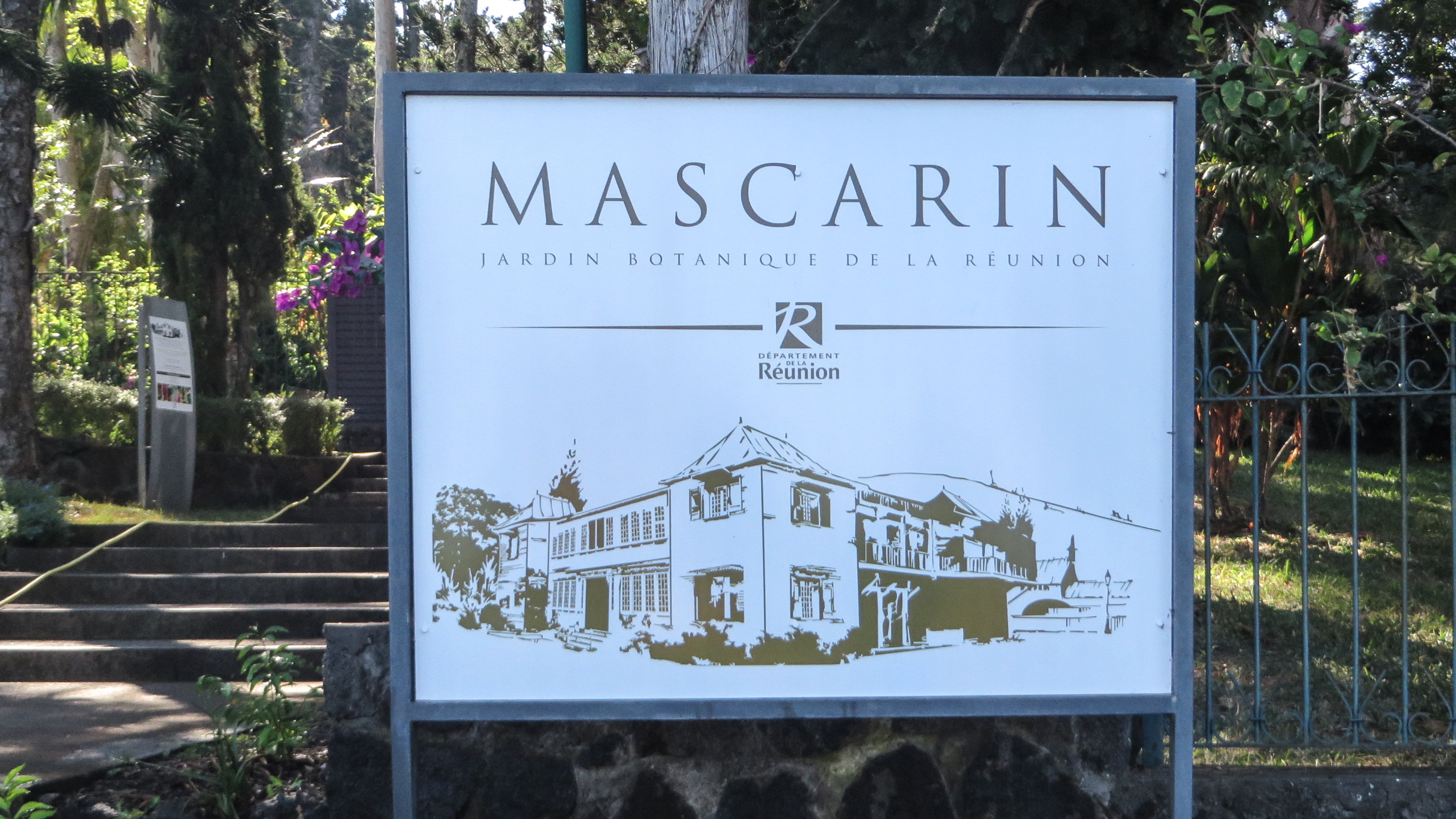
Entrance to the Botanical Gardens Mascarin

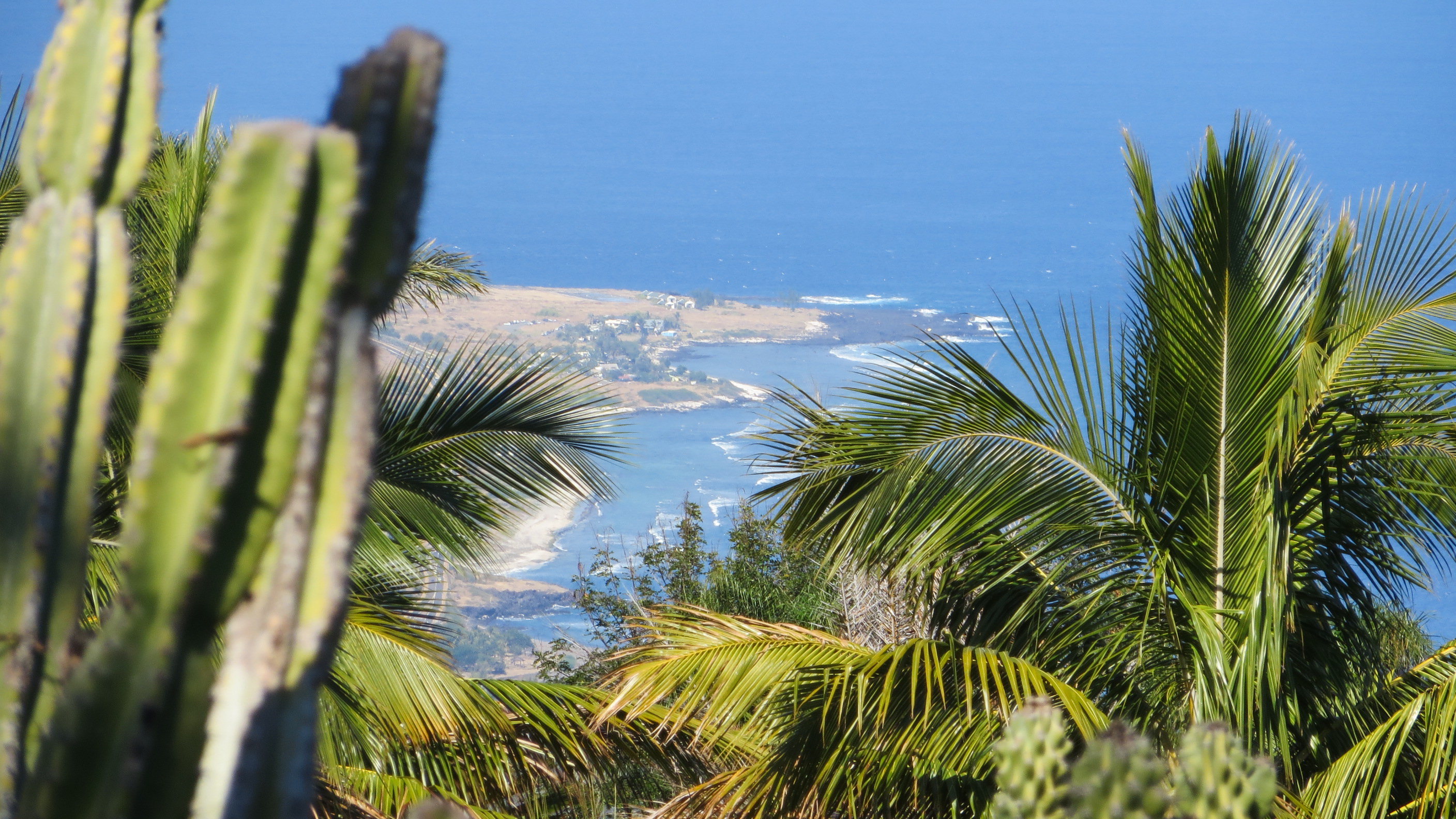
Western coast of La Réunion from the Botanical Gardens

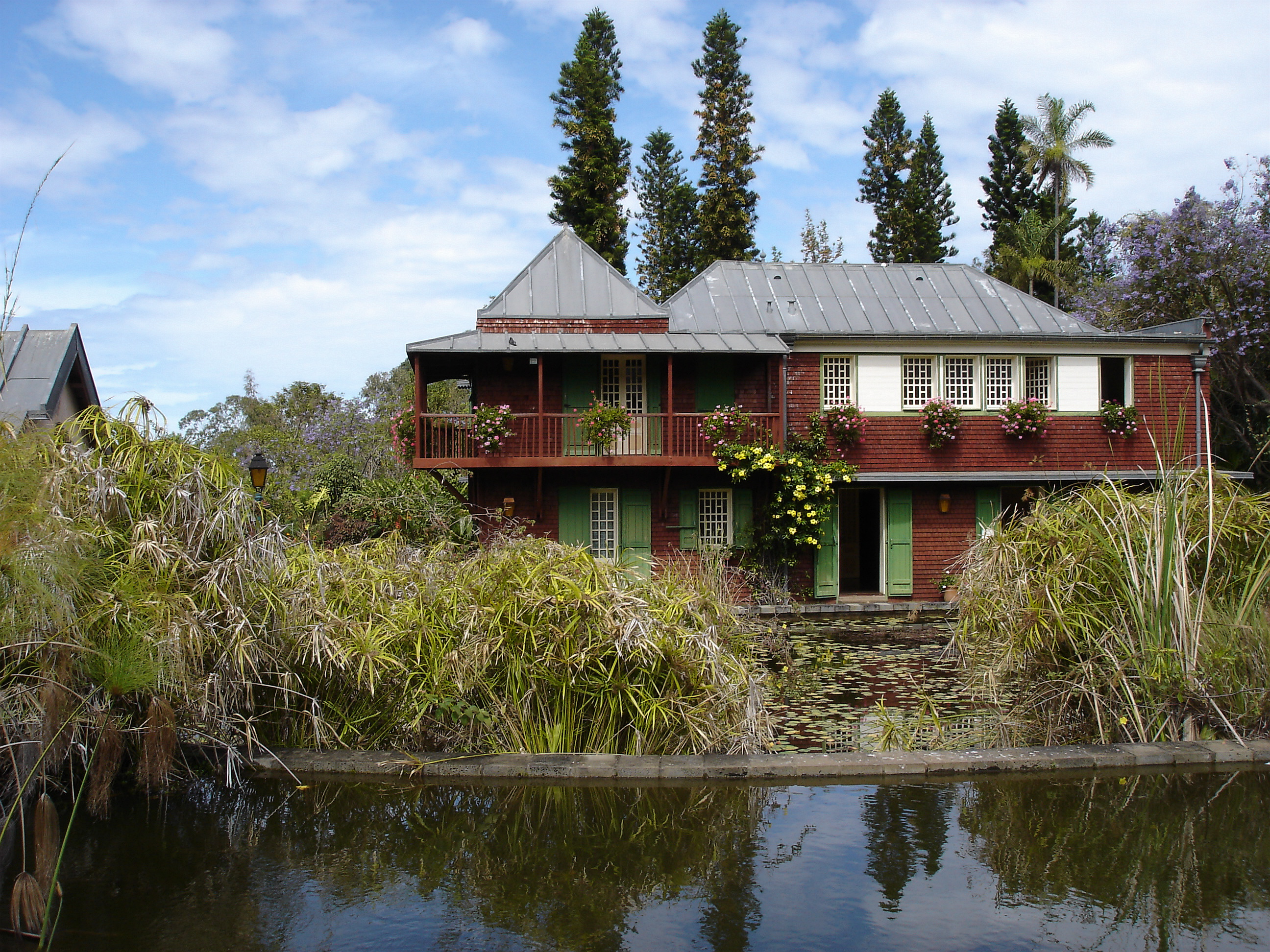
Conservatoire botanique national de Mascarin

The Conservatoire botanique national de Mascarin (12.5 hectares) is a national conservatory and botanical garden located at 2, rue du Père Georges, Colimaçons, Saint-Leu, Réunion, France. It is open daily except Monday; an admission fee is charged.

The conservatory was established in 1986 as the Conservatoire et Jardin Botanique de Mascarin on farmland belonging to the family of the Marquis Antoine Sosthène Armand de Châteauvieux, at an elevation of 500 meters on the leeward side of La Réunion. In 1993 it was given its current name as it became one of France's eight Conservatoires Botaniques Nationaux. In 1996 its mission changed focus from conservation within its gardens, and the cultivation and the propagation of rare and threatened plants endemic to La Réunion, to a primary emphasis on management and monitoring of species in their natural habitats.

The conservatory's ongoing projects include establishing plots in mid-elevation wet forests for long-term study of plant diversity and vegetation dynamics; field surveys to determine locations for rare endemics (such as the highly endangered Ruizia cordata and Carissa xylopicron; replanting the endangered Lomatophyllum macrum in situ; and seed germination studies of endemic plants including Hugonia serrata and Antirhea borbonica.

The conservatory's garden (3 hectares) contains about 4,000 plant species endemic to the Mascarene Islands, i.e., including Madagascar, Mauritius, and Rodrigues, as well as Réunion itself. It is organized into seven sections as follows:

- Réunion collection - indigenous flora, including more than 50 endemic species.
- Lontan plants - a historical collection of local agriculture, including coffee, spices, fruit trees, sugar cane, and geraniums.
- Orchard - more than 50 fruit tree species.
- Succulents - succulent plants and exotic cacti, including species from the Americas and Africa.
- Palm trees - endemic and exotic palm trees.
- Orchids - orchids.
- Bamboo ravine - bamboos.
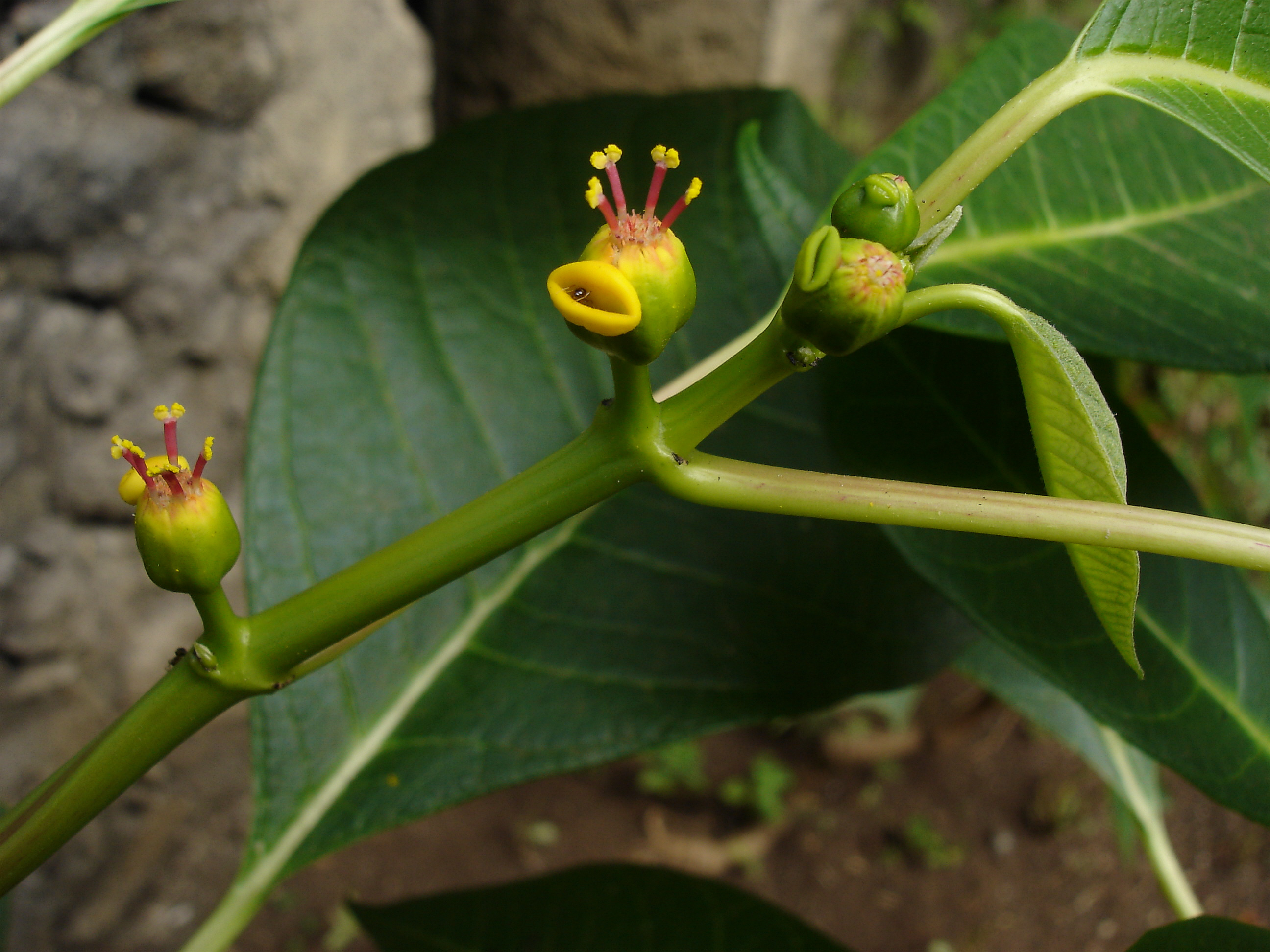
an euphorbe to be identified in the garden.

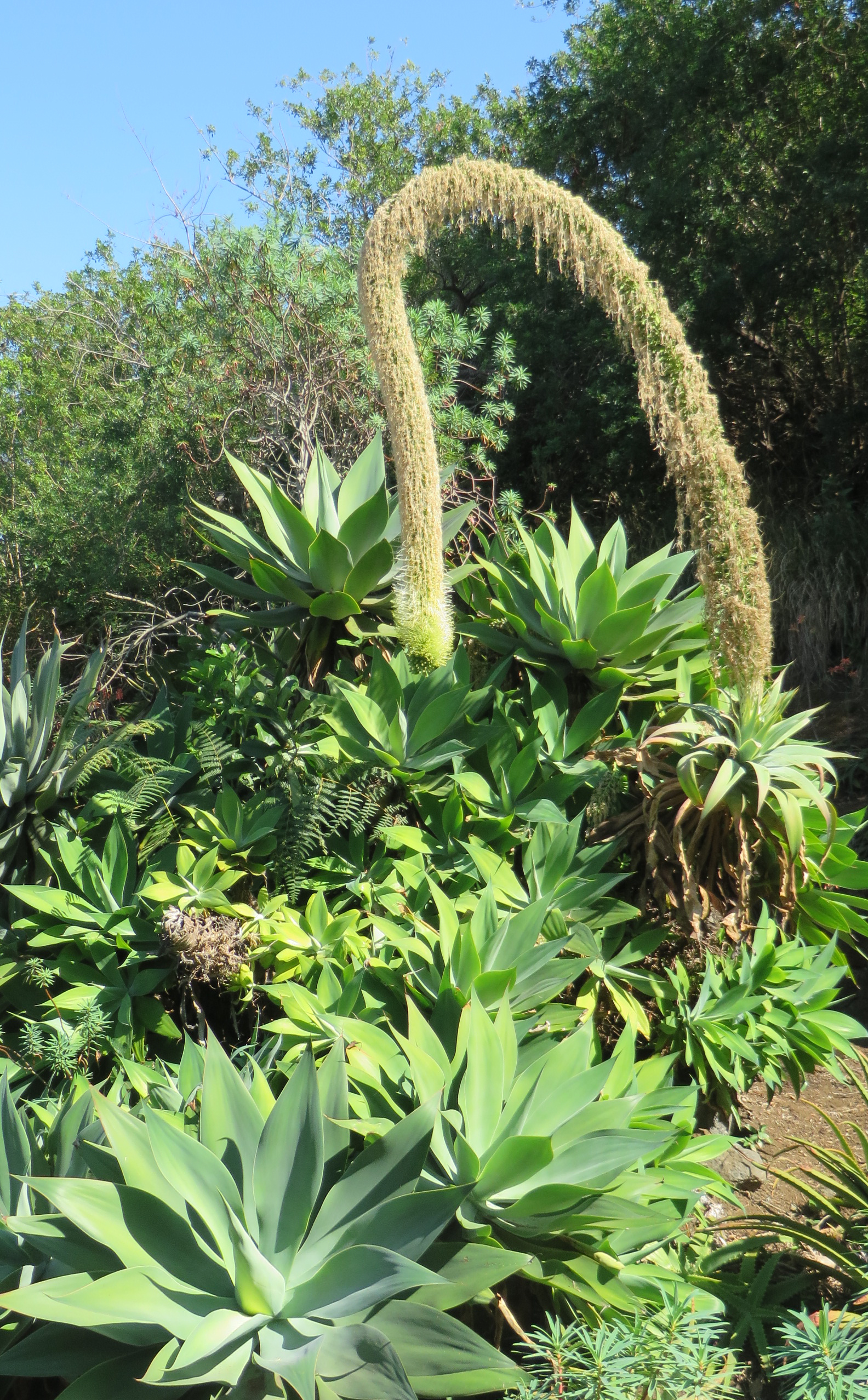

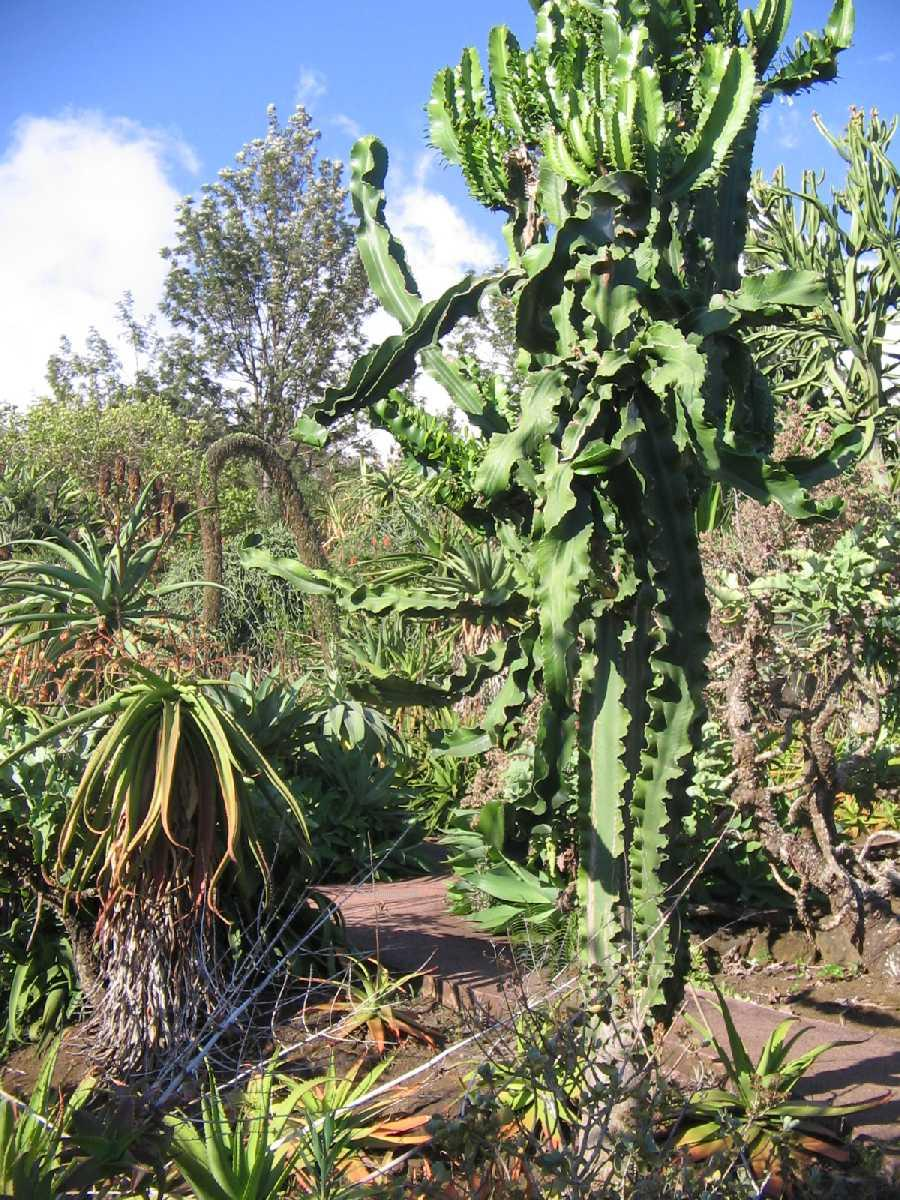

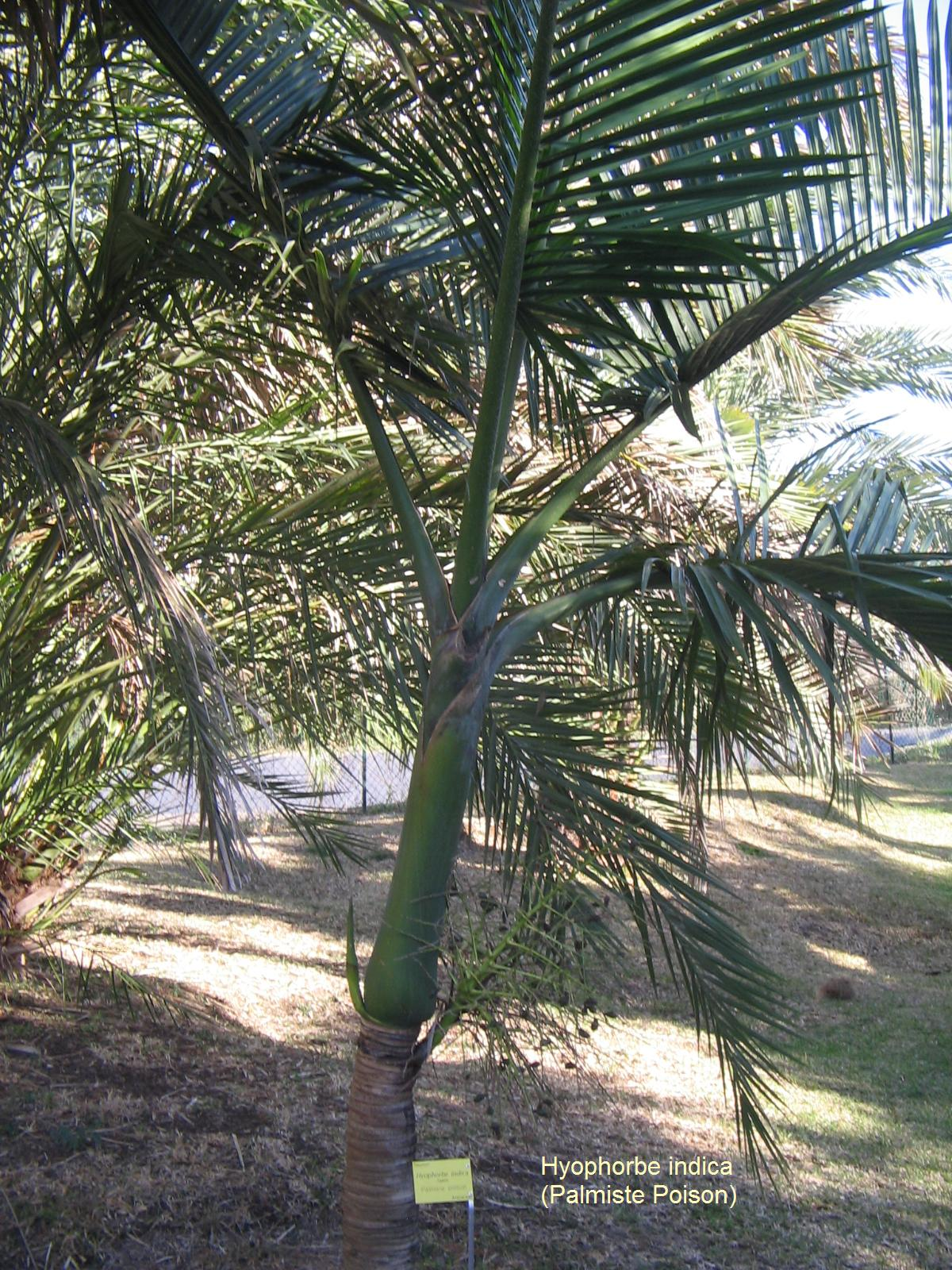
Hyophorbe indica

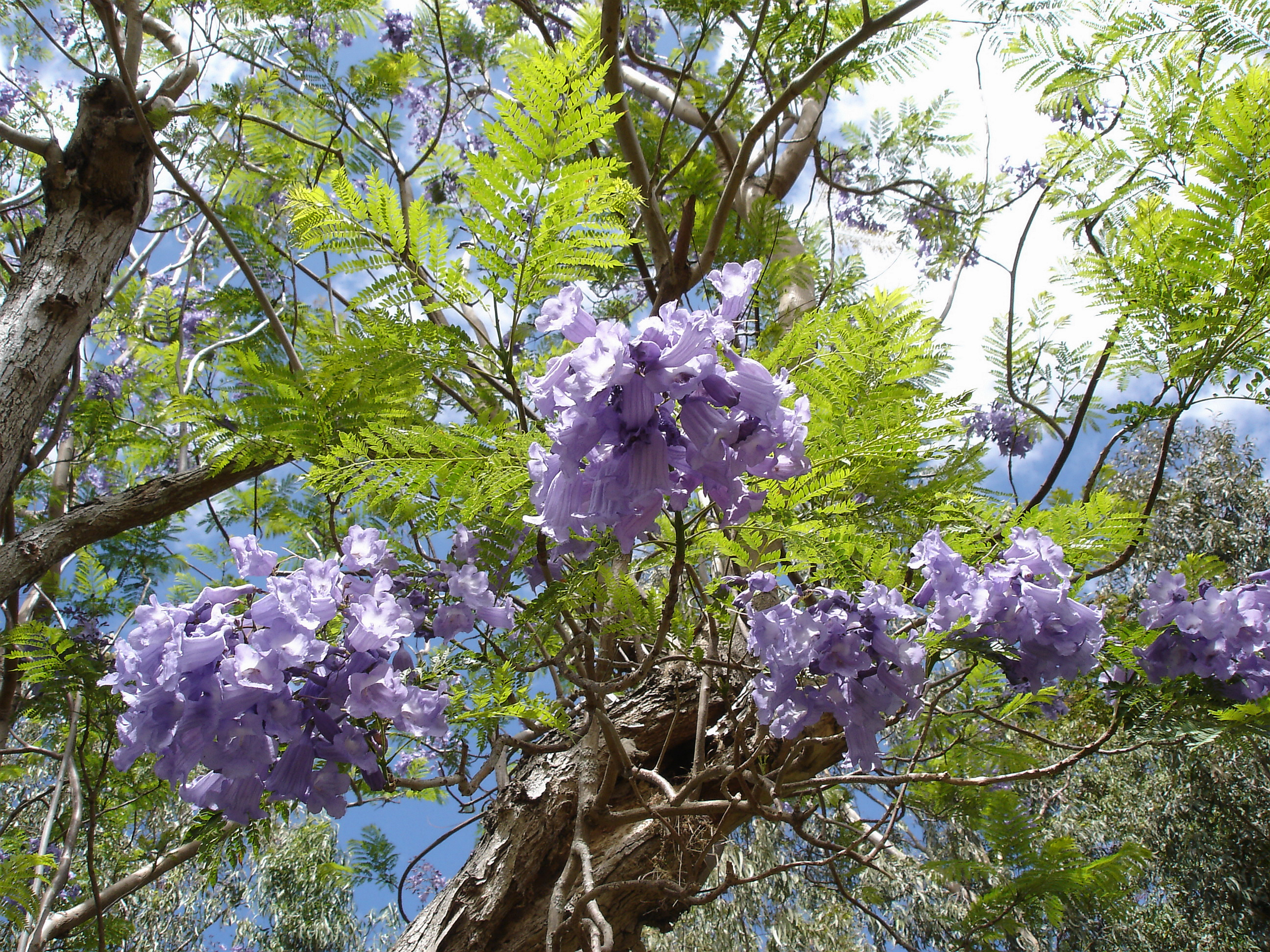
Jacaranda mimosifolia

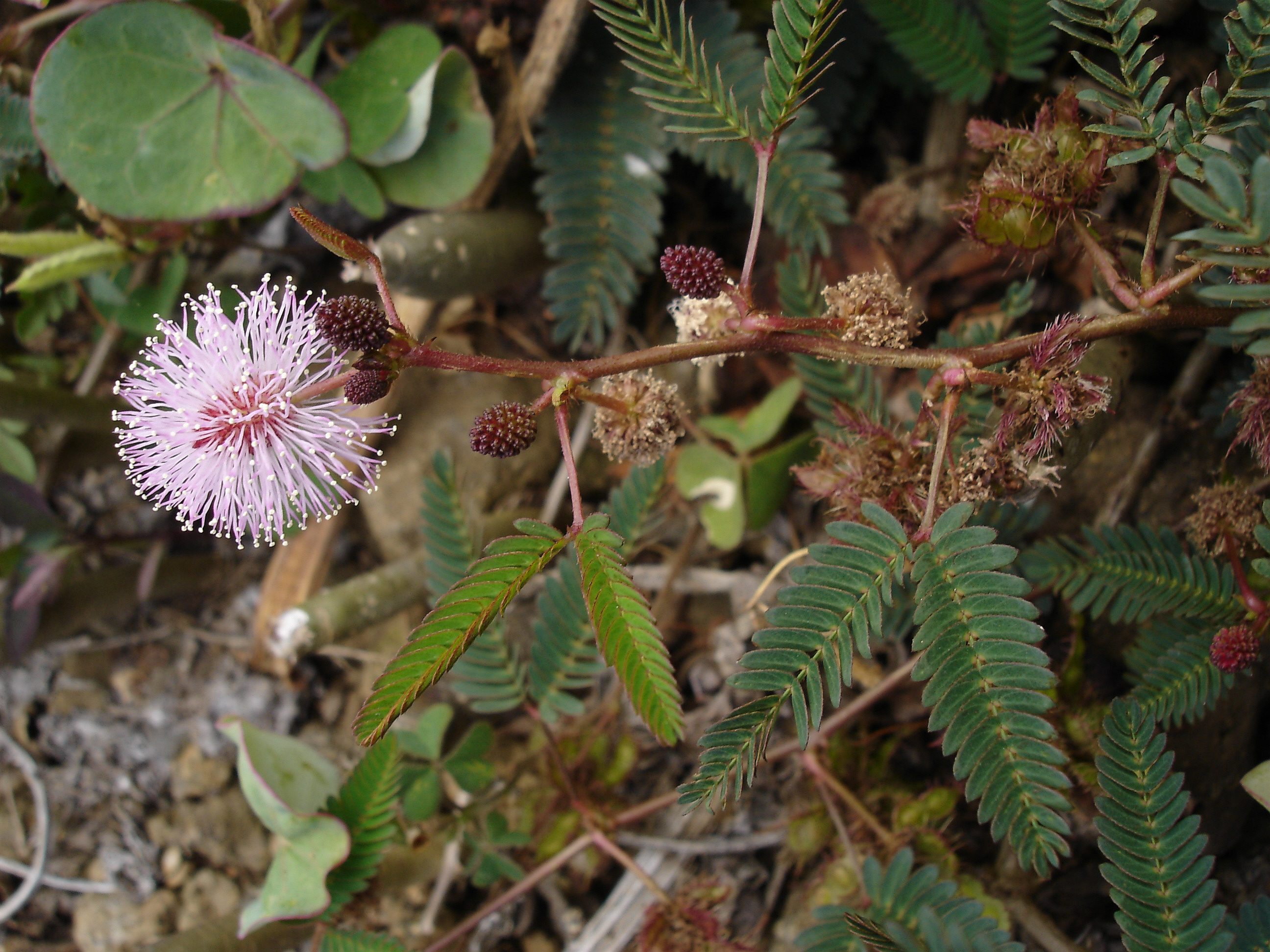
Mimosa pudica

== See also ==
- List of botanical gardens in France
- Marie-Thérèse de Chateauvieux
