= Jean-Claude Fruteau =

French politician and a Member of the European Parliament (1947–2022)

Member of the National Assembly for Réunion's 5th constituency
- In office 20 June 2007 – 20 June 2017
- Preceded by: Bertho Audifax
- Succeeded by: Jean-Hugues Ratenon

Mayor of Saint-Benoît, Réunion
- In office 9 March 2008 – 28 April 2022
- Preceded by: Bertho Audifax

Member of the European Parliament for Réunion
- In office 20 July 1999 – 25 June 2007
- Succeeded by: Catherine Néris (PES)

Personal details
- Born: 6 June 1947 Saint-Benoît, Réunion, France
- Died: 28 April 2022 (aged 74) Saint-Benoît, Réunion, France
- Party: Socialist Party
- Profession: Teacher

Jean-Claude Fruteau (6 June 1947 – 28 April 2022) was a French politician and a Member of the European Parliament for France's "outre mer" from 1999 to 2007. He was a member of the Socialist Party, which was part of the Party of European Socialists, and was vice-chair of the European Parliament's Committee on Agriculture and Rural Development.

He was also a substitute for the Committee on the Internal Market and Consumer Protection and a substitute for the delegation to the ACP-EU Joint Parliamentary Assembly.

== Career ==
- Highest postgraduate teaching qualification in language and literature (CAPES) (1972)
- Teacher in higher education, with the highest postgraduate teaching qualification
- First federal secretary, Réunion Socialist Party (1981–2000)
- Mayor of Saint-Benoît (Réunion) (1983–1999)
- Member of the Réunion Departmental Council (since 1982)
- Member of the European Parliament (1999–2007)
- Member of the French Parliament (2007–2017)
