= Réunion's 3rd constituency =

Constituency of the French Fifth Republic

3rd constituency of Réunion
- inline Constituency of the National Assembly of France

- The constituency in Réunion
- Deputy: Joseph Rivière; RN
- Department: Réunion

The 3rd constituency of Réunion is a French legislative constituency on the island of Réunion. As of 2024, it is represented by Joseph Rivière, a National Rally deputy.

== Deputies ==
Election	Member	Party
1958	Marcel Cerneau	DVD
1962	Marcel Cerneau	DVD
1967	Marcel Cerneau	DVD
1968	Marcel Cerneau	DVD
1973	Marcel Cerneau	DVD
1978	Pierre Lagourgue	UDF
1981	Wilfrid Bertile	PS
1986	Proportional representation - no election by constituency	
1988	André Thien Ah Koon	DVD
1993	André Thien Ah Koon	DVD
1997	André Thien Ah Koon	DVD
2002	André Thien Ah Koon	DVD
2007	Didier Robert	UMP
2010	Jacqueline Farreyrol	UMP
2012	Jean-Jacques Vlody	PS
2017	Nathalie Bassire	LR
2022	Nathalie Bassire	LR
2024	Joseph Rivière	RN

== Election results ==
=== 2024 ===
Candidate	Party	Alliance	First round		Second round	
Candidate	Party	Alliance	Votes	%	Votes	%
Joseph Rivière	RN		13,360	31.56	22,831	51.43
Alexis Chaussalet	PLR	NFP	10,076	23.80	21,559	48.57
Nathalie Bassire	DVD		9,718	22.96		
Monique Benard	DVD		4,207	9.94		
Jean-Jacques Vlody*	PS diss.		2,121	5.01		
Didier Hoareau	EXD		2,083	4.92		
Nicolas Legentil	LO		540	1.28		
Jean-Eric Theine	DSV		229	0.54		
Antoine Fontaine	REG		0	0.00		
Valid votes			42,334	100.00	44,390	100.00
Blank votes			1,490	3.29	2,385	4.89
Null votes			1,529	3.37	2,044	4.19
Turnout			45,353	45.89	48,819	49.38
Abstentions			53,482	54.11	50,052	50.62
Registered voters			98,835		98,871	
Result			RN GAIN FROM LR			

* Jean-Jacques Vlody stood as a dissident PS candidate, without the support of the NFP, of which PS is a member

=== 2022 ===
Candidate	Label	First round		Second round	
Candidate	Label	Votes	%	Votes	%
Patrice Thien Ah Koon	LR (UDC)	6,351	21.68	14,091	48.13
Nathalie Bassire	LR diss.	4,904	16.74	15,186	51.87
Alexis Chaussalet	LFI (NUPES)	4,853	16.57		
Didier Hoareau	RN	3,990	13.62		
Bachil Valy	LREM (ENS)	2,831	9.67		
Jean-Jacques Vlody	PS	1,781	6.10		
Antoine Fontaine	DVG	1,232	4.21		
Rémy Bourgogne	PLR diss.	987	3.37		
Aurélie Vigne	PCR	839	2.86		
Didier Técher	DVC	450	1.54		
Raphaël Dijoux	GE	411	1.40		
Sandrine Moukine	DLF (UPF)	348	1.19		
Yves Thebault	LO	306	1.04		
Votes		29,289	100.00	29,277	100.00
Valid votes		29,289	91.71	29,277	85.56
Blank votes		1,288	4.03	2,211	6.46
Null votes		1,361	4.26	2,730	7.98
Turnout		31,938	33.20	34,218	35.56
Abstentions		64,273	66.80	62,012	64.44
Registered voters		96,211		96,230	
Source: Ministry of the Interior

=== 2017 ===
Candidate	Label	First round		Second round	
Candidate	Label	Votes	%	Votes	%
Nathalie Bassire	LR	8,915	28.28	19,652	56.44
Jacquet Hoarau	DVD	8,260	26.20	15,167	43.56
Jean-Jacques Vlody	PS	3,601	11.42		
Carine Garcia	REM	3,370	10.69		
Virginie Grondin	FI	2,935	9.31		
Jean-Hugues Lebian	FN	2,213	7.02		
Antoine Fontaine	DIV	879	2.79		
Raphaël Dijoux	ECO	426	1.35		
Catherine M'Couezou	EXG	336	1.07		
Philippe Hoareau	DIV	323	1.02		
Clémendeau Hoarau	DIV	271	0.86		
Votes		31,529	100.00	34,819	100.00
Valid votes		31,529	89.71	34,819	85.39
Blank votes		1,766	5.02	2,674	6.56
Null votes		1,850	5.26	3,282	8.05
Turnout		35,145	37.89	40,775	43.96
Abstentions		57,616	62.11	51,977	56.04
Registered voters		92,761		92,752	
Source: Ministry of the Interior

=== 2012 ===
2012 legislative election in La-Reunion's 3rd constituency
Candidate	Party	First round		Second round	
Candidate	Party	Votes	%	Votes	%
Jean-Jacques Vlody	PS	16,267	40.88%	27,088	60.06%
André Thien Ah Koon		13,528	34.00%	18,032	39.98%
Paulet Payet	DVD	4,762	11.97%		
Yvan Dejean	PCR	2,405	6.04%		
Corinne Suzanne	FN	1,166	2.93%		
Jean-Alain Cadet	EELV	643	1.62%		
Pascal Basse	FG	427	1.07%		
Franck Deloras	??	402	1.01%		
Aniel Boyer		192	0.48%		
Valid votes		39,792	94.92%	45,100	92.83%
Spoilt and null votes		2,129	5.08%	3,482	7.17%
Votes cast / turnout		41,921	50.00%	48,582	57.95%
Abstentions		41,929	50.00%	35,249	42.05%
Registered voters		83,850	100.00%	83,831	100.00%

== Sources ==
- French Interior Ministry results website: "Résultats électoraux officiels en France" (in French).
