= 1988 French cantonal elections =

Cantonale elections to renew canton general councillors were held in France on 25 September and 2 October 1988. Abstention exploded to 50.9% in the first round and 53% in the runoff, likely due to the election being the third held that here after the presidential and legislative elections. The right narrowly won, with 50.3% to 49.6% to the left. However, the status quo prevailed.

== Electoral system ==
The cantonales elections use the same system as the regional or legislative elections. There is a 10% threshold (10% of registered voters) needed to proceed to the second round.

== Change in control ==
=== From right to left ===
- Gironde

=== From left to right ===
- Alpes-de-Haute-Provence

== National results ==
unavailable
