= Marie-Thérèse de Chateauvieux =

French politician

Marie-Thérèse de Chateauvieux (born Marie-Thérèse d'Armand de Chateauvieux) (April 20, 1915, Saint-Denis. Réunion - April 12, 2017, Paris) was a French politician who became the General Councilor of the French Overseas territory of Réunion and later the mayor of Saint-Leu.

== Biography ==
Daughter of Georges d'Armand de Chateauvieux and Amélie Adam de Villiers, Marie-Thérèse de Chateauvieux was born on April 20, 1915, in Saint-Denis. Great-granddaughter of the Marquis Joseph Antoine Sosthènes d'Armand de Chateauvieux, she headed the large agricultural estate which was established by the Marquis in the Hauts of the commune of Saint-Leu, when her father Georges died in 1961.

In 1965, de Chateauvieux became the first woman mayor of the department of Réunion. She succeeded Henri Bègue, who asked her to replace him as mayor of Saint-Leu. She was reelected in 1971 and 1976, before being beaten by Mario Hoareau in 1983. De Chateauvieux was also the General Councilor of La Réunion in 1970.

De Chateauvieux is the cousin of the father of the businessman Jacques de Chateauvieux. Her family-owned estate properties, but sold them out to be transformed into the National Botanical Conservatory of Mascarin in the early 1990s. She celebrated her 100th birthday on birthday on April 20, 2015.

De Chateauvieux died on April 12, 2017, in Paris, a few days before her 102nd birthday. She was buried in Saint-Leu.

== See also ==
- Conservatoire botanique national de Mascarin
