= Frédéric Maillot =

French politician

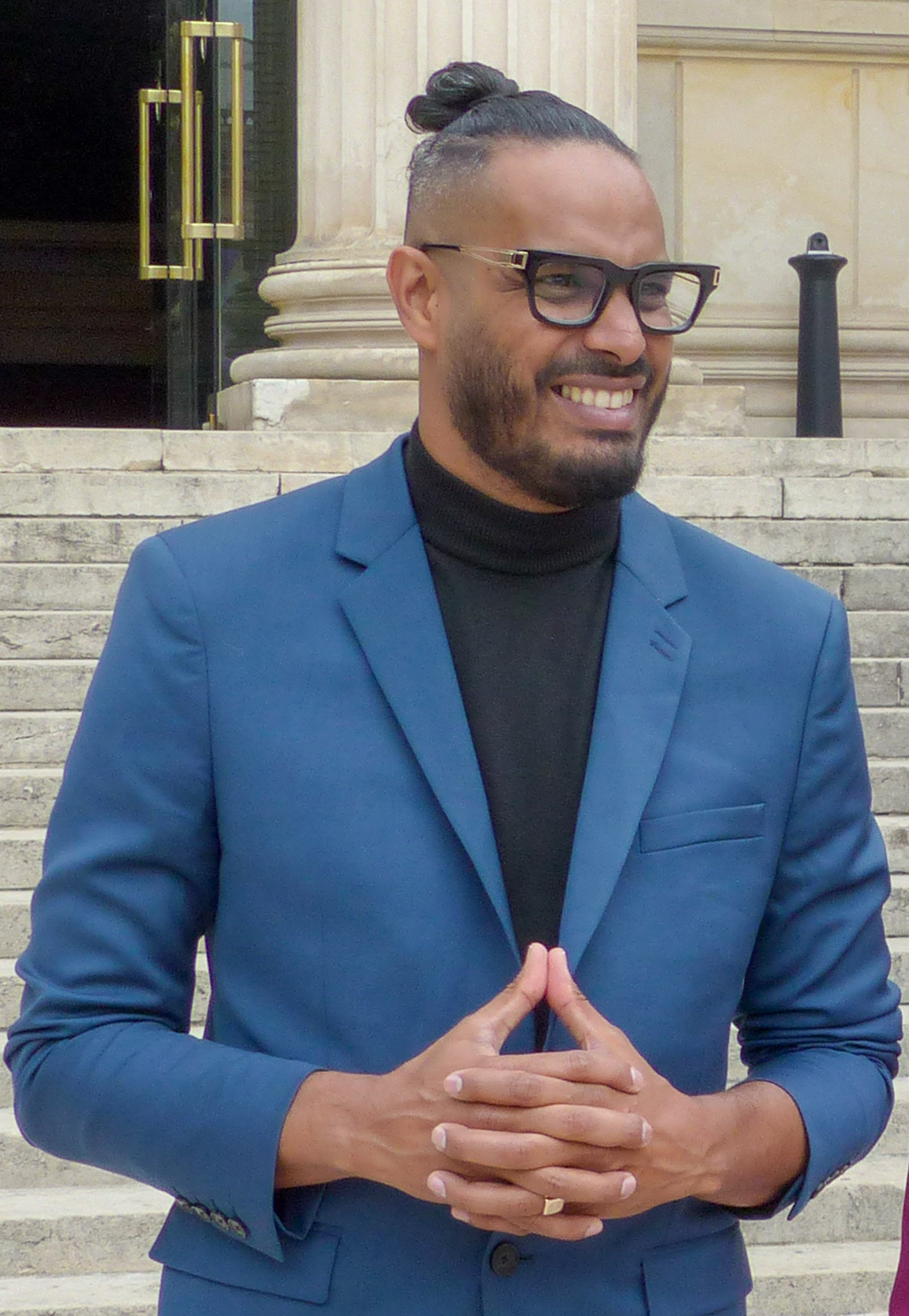

Deputy of the French National Assembly for Réunion's 6th constituency
- Incumbent
- Assumed office 19 June 2022
- Preceded by: Nadia Ramassamy

Personal details
- Born: 15 November 1986 Saint-Denis, Réunion, France
- Party: PLR

Frédéric Maillot is a French politician who was elected to represent Réunion's 6th constituency in the 2022 legislative election. Maillot has served as vice president of the Regional Council of Réunion.

== Biography ==
Maillot was raised in a working-class family in Le Chaudron, Saint-Denis, Réunion.

=== 2022 National Assembly election ===
In the 2022 National Assembly election, Maillot ran to represent Réunion's 6th constituency. He ran as a candidate of Rassemblement Réunionnais, a coalition of legislative candidates affiliated with the left-wing New Ecologic and Social People's Union (NUPES) coalition.
