= Nathalie Bassire =

French politician

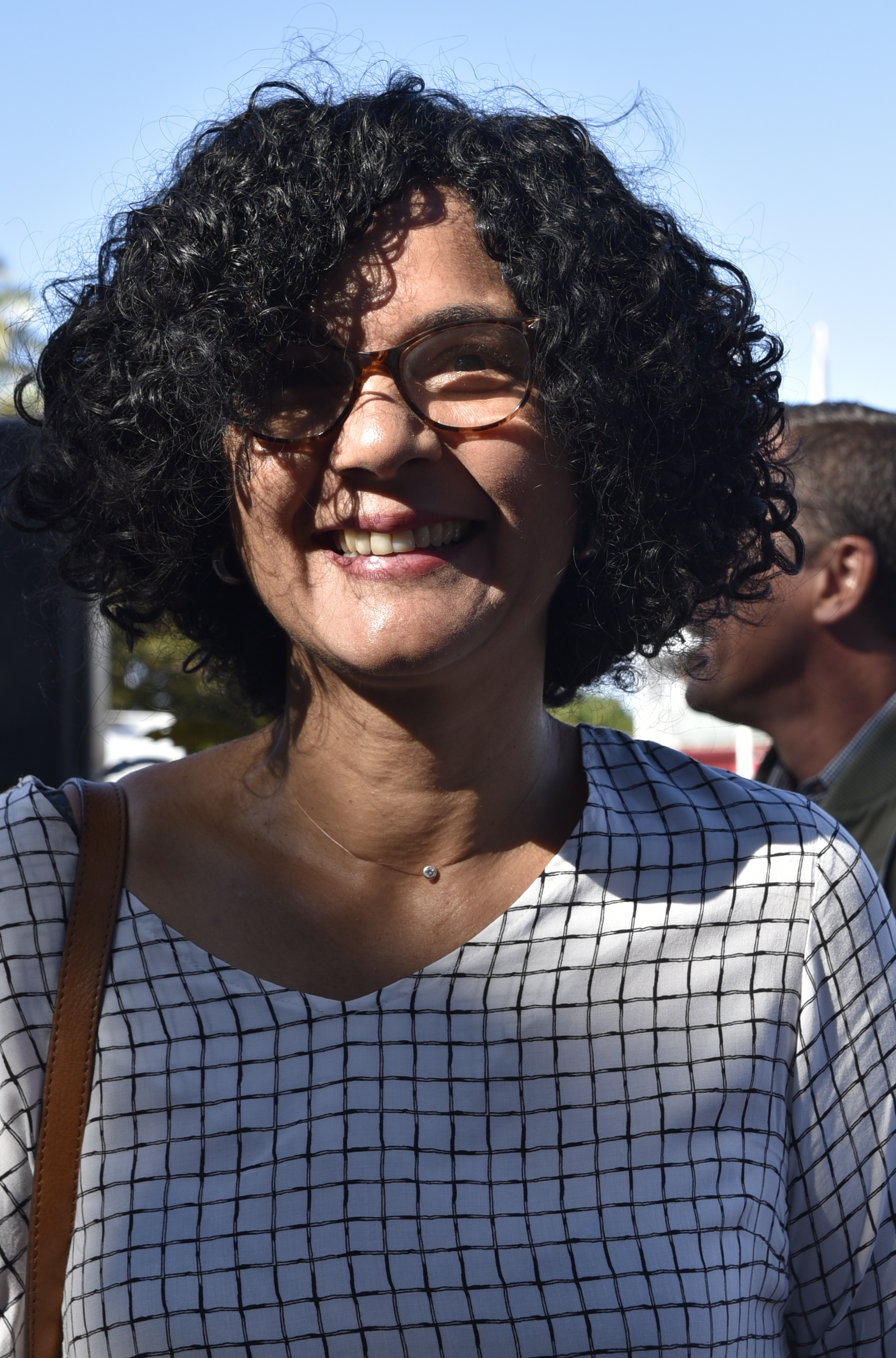

Member of the French National Assembly for Réunion's 3rd constituency
- In office 21 June 2017 – 9 June 2024
- Preceded by: Jean-Jacques Vlody

Personal details
- Born: 22 January 1968 (age 58) Saint-Pierre, Réunion
- Party: LR

Nathalie Bassire (born 22 January 1968) is a French politician of Republicans (LR) who has been serving as a member of the National Assembly from 2017 to 2024, representing Réunion's 3rd constituency.

== Political career ==
Bassire is a municipal councillor for Le Tampon, and since 2008 a member of the General Council of Réunion. Since 2015 she has also been a member of the regional council.

In parliament, Bassire serves on the Sustainable Development, Spatial and Regional Planning Committee.

Ahead of the 2022 presidential elections, Bassire publicly declared her support for Valérie Pécresse as the Republicans’ candidate. She was re-elected at the 2022 French legislative election.

She ran for re-election in the 2022 legislative elections and was re-elected in the second round with 51.87% of the votes cast. On June 28, 2022, she ran for president of the National Assembly for the Libertés, indépendants, outre-mer et territoires group and received 16 votes.

In the 2024 election, she came third in the first round, and lost her seat.
