= Nadia Ramassamy =

French politician

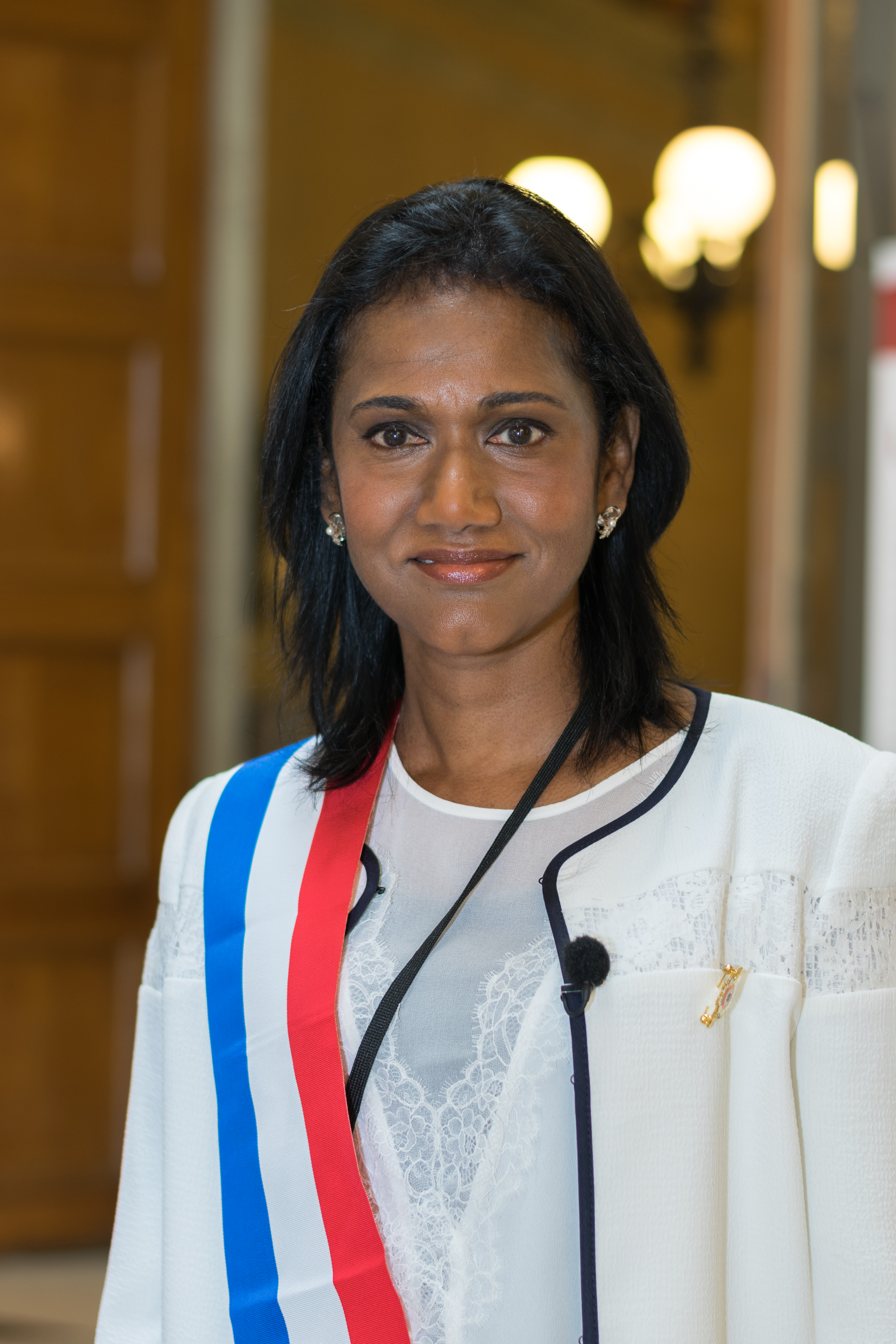

Deputy of the French National Assembly for Réunion's 6th constituency
- In office 21 June 2017 – 21 June 2022
- Preceded by: Monique Orphé
- Succeeded by: Frédéric Maillot

Personal details
- Born: Marie-Nadia Ramassamy; 17 May 1961 (age 65) Saint-Denis, Réunion
- Party: LR

Nadia Ramassamy (born 17 May 1961) is a French politician from Réunion. She was elected the MP for Réunion's 6th constituency since 2017.

== Career ==
Aside being a politician, she continues to practice medicine, especially during the COVID-19 pandemic.

She lost her seat in the 2022 French legislative election.
