= Joseph Rivière (politician) =

French politician

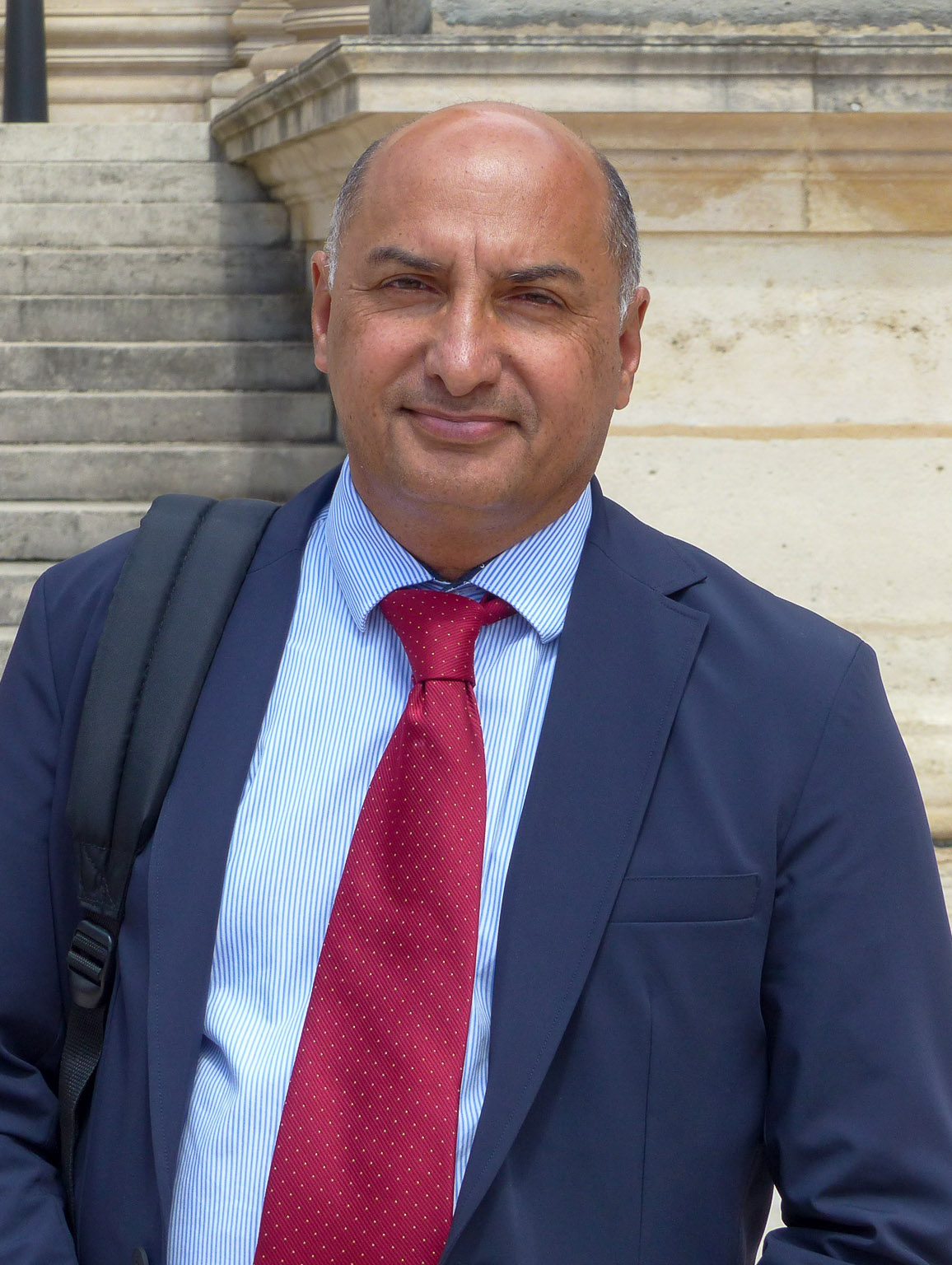

Member of the French National Assembly for Réunion's 3rd constituency
- Incumbent
- Assumed office 18 July 2024
- Preceded by: Nathalie Bassire

Personal details
- Political party: National Rally

Joseph Rivière (French pronunciation: [ʒozɛf ʁivjɛʁ]) is a French politician of the National Rally (RN). He was elected member of the National Assembly for Réunion's 3rd constituency in 2024.

He and Anchya Bamana from Mayotte's 2nd constituency are the first RN MPs in overseas constituencies.
