= Jean-Luc Poudroux =

French politician

Member of the National Assembly for Réunion's 7th constituency
- In office 1 October 2018 – 21 June 2022
- Preceded by: Thierry Robert
- Succeeded by: Perceval Gaillard

Personal details
- Born: 29 August 1950 (age 75) Saint-Leu, Réunion
- Party: Rassemblement National
- Occupation: politician

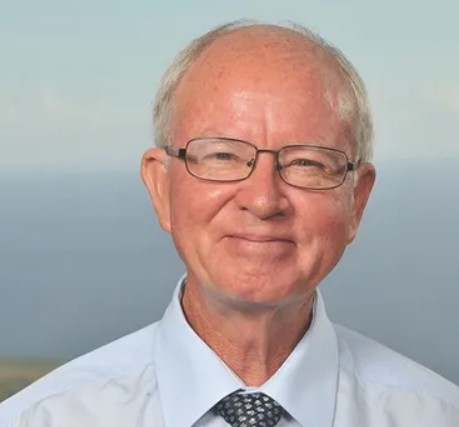
POUDROUX Jean-Luc

Jean-Luc Poudroux (born 29 August 1950) is a French politician who was elected Member of Parliament for Réunion's 7th constituency in the 2018 by-election.

He stood down at the 2022 French legislative election.

== See also ==
- List of deputies of the 16th National Assembly of France
