= Réunion's 7th constituency =

French legislative constituency

7th constituency of Réunion
- inline Constituency of the National Assembly of France

- The constituency in Réunion
- Deputy: Perceval Gaillard; RÉ974
- Department: Réunion
- Cantons: Les Avirons, L'Étang-Salé, Saint-Leu-1, Saint-Leu-2, Saint-Louis-1, Saint-Paul-4, Saint-Paul-5, Les Trois-Bassins
- Registered voters: 121,201

The 7th constituency of Réunion is a French legislative constituency on the island of Réunion. The constituency is located on the west coast. As of 2024, it is represented by Perceval Gaillard, a Rézistans Égalité 974 deputy, close to La France Insoumise.

== Deputies ==
Election	Member	Party
2012	Thierry Robert	MoDem
2017	Thierry Robert	MoDem
2018	Jean-Luc Poudroux	DVD
2022	Perceval Gaillard	RÉ974
2024	Perceval Gaillard	RÉ974

== Election results ==
=== 2024 ===
Candidate	Party	Alliance	First round		Second round	
Candidate	Party	Alliance	Votes	%	Votes	%
Perceval Gaillard	RÉ974	NFP	14,851	29.55	29,190	57.33
Jean-Luc Poudroux	RN		12,853	25.57	21,725	42.67
Thierry Robert	DVC		11,083	22.05		
Cyrille Hamilcaro	DVD		3,754	7.47		
Karim Juhoor	DVG		2,854	5.68		
Isaline Tronc	DVG		2,651	5.27		
Jean-Luc Payet	LO		724	1.44		
Nathalie De Boisvilliers	REC		551	1.10		
Richelain Catherine	DIV		479	0.95		
Sandrine Moukine	DIV		461	0.92		
Valid votes			50,261	100.00	50,915	100.00
Blank votes			1,806	3.35	2,858	5.07
Null votes			1,792	3.33	2,625	4.65
Turnout			53,859	44.46	56,398	46.53
Abstentions			67,287	55.54	64,803	53.47
Registered voters			121,146		121,201	
Result			RÉ974 HOLD			

=== 2022 ===
Candidate	Party	First round			Second round		
Candidate	Party	Votes	%	+/–	Votes	%	+/–
Thierry Robert	DVC	7,912	24.53	New	17,483	48.76	New
Perceval Gaillard	RÉ974 (NUPES)	6,716	20.82	+5.77	18,372	51.24	New
Johan Guillou	DVG	4,376	13.57	New			
Hélène Coddeville	LREM (ENS)	2,837	8.79	-9.28			
Johnatan Rivière	RN	2,656	8.23	+5.64			
Jean-François Nativel	LMR	2,055	6.37	+0.22			
Karim Juhoor	DVG	1,416	4.39	New			
Isaline Tronc	DVG	1,150	3.56	New			
Gaël Velleyen	REG	907	2.81	New			
Éric Marcely	LP (UPF)	636	1.97	New			
François Valeama	PCR	488	1.51	-2.24			
Jean-Luc Payet	LO	333	1.03	New			
Richelain Catherine	DIV	331	1.03	New			
Rémy Massain	PRG	228	0.71	New			
Jérôme Bachou	LREM diss.	218	0.68	New			
Votes		32,259	100.00		35,855	100.00	
Valid votes		32,259	93.07		35,855	89.22	
Blank votes		1,134	3.27		2,194	5.46	
Null votes		1,269	3.66		2,136	5.32	
Turnout		34,662	29.31	+8.03	40,185	33.97	+3.34
Abstentions		83,583	70.69		78,102	66.03	
Registered voters		118,245			118,287		
Source: Ministère de l’Interieur

=== 2018 by-election ===
- On July 6, 2018, the Constitutional Council declares Thierry Robert ineligible his office of deputy for a period of three years for failure to fulfill his tax obligations.

Candidate	Party	First round			Second round		
Candidate	Party	Votes	%	+/–	Votes	%	+/–
Jean-Luc Poudroux	DVD (supported by LR–UDI)	6,402	27.11	New	17,228	59.44	New
Pierrick Robert	MoDem	4,030	17.07	New	11,754	40.56	New
Aurélien Centon	SE	3,582	15.17	New			
Emmanuel Séraphin	DVG (supported by PS)	2,241	9.49	-1.36			
Jean-François Nativel	SE	1,677	7.10	+0.95			
Perceval Gaillard	FI	1,137	4.81	-7.06			
Gilles Leperlier	PCR	886	3.75	New			
Ulrich Quinot	SE	845	3.58	New			
Jean-Pierre Marchau	EELV	744	0.75	New			
Mathieu Hoarau	DVD	725	3.07	New			
Michelle Lartin-Graja	RN	617	2.61	-1.48			
Jonathan Rivière	LR dissident	570	2.41	-1.09			
Fabien Dijoux	UPR	158	0.67	-0.59			
Votes		23,614	100.00	–	28,982	100.00	–
Valid votes		23,614	21.28		28,982	26.12	
Blank votes		854	0.77		1,873	1.69	
Null votes		1,221	1.10		3,135	2.83	
Turnout		25,689	23.15		33,990	30.63	
Abstentions		85,279	76.85		76,977	69.37	
Registered voters		110,968			110,967		
Source: Ministère de l’Interieur

=== 2017 ===
Candidate	Label	First round		Second round	
Candidate	Label	Votes	%	Votes	%
Thierry Robert	MoDem	11,144	33.87	22,305	60.78
Fabrice Marouvin-Viramalé	DVD	5,409	16.44	14,390	39.22
Perceval Gaillard	FI	3,905	11.87		
Emmanuel Seraphin	DVG	3,569	10.85		
Sandra Sinimalé	LR	2,373	7.21		
Jean-François Nativel	DIV	2,023	6.15		
Michelle Graja	FN	1,346	4.09		
Jonathan Rivière	DVD	1,151	3.50		
Éric Marcely	ECO	794	2.41		
Julietta Ichiza-Imaho	DVG	448	1.36		
Laurent Jourdanne	DIV	414	1.26		
Denis Favre	DIV	322	0.98		
Votes		32,898	100.00	36,695	100.00
Valid votes		32,898	90.37	36,695	84.45
Blank votes		1,779	4.89	3,228	7.43
Null votes		1,725	4.74	3,529	8.12
Turnout		36,402	32.98	43,452	39.37
Abstentions		73,965	67.02	66,914	60.63
Registered voters		110,367		110,366	
Source: Ministry of the Interior

=== 2012 ===
2012 legislative election in La-Reunion's 7th constituency
Candidate	Party	First round		Second round	
Candidate	Party	Votes	%	Votes	%
Thierry Robert	MoDem	16,224	37.81%	29,366	66.90%
Jean-Claude Lacouture	UMP	9,450	22.02%	14,532	33.10%
Fabrice Hoarau	PCR	5,125	11.94%		
Jean-Marie Lasson	PS	4,822	11.24%		
Jean-Marc Gamarus		3,289	7.67%		
Danon-Lutchmee Odoyen	EELV	1,496	3.49%		
Jean-Claude Otto-Bruc	FN	1,239	2.89%		
Jean-Hugues Savigny	FG	788	1.84%		
Pierre Magnin	PP	329	0.77%		
Denis Simonin		146	0.34%		
Valid votes		42,908	94.54%	43,898	90.28%
Spoilt and null votes		2,480	5.46%	4,727	9.72%
Votes cast / turnout		45,388	45.80%	48,625	49.07%
Abstentions		53,714	54.20%	50,470	50.93%
Registered voters		99,102	100.00%	99,095	100.00%

== Sources ==
- French Interior Ministry results website: "Résultats électoraux officiels en France" (in French).
