= Didier Robert =

French politician

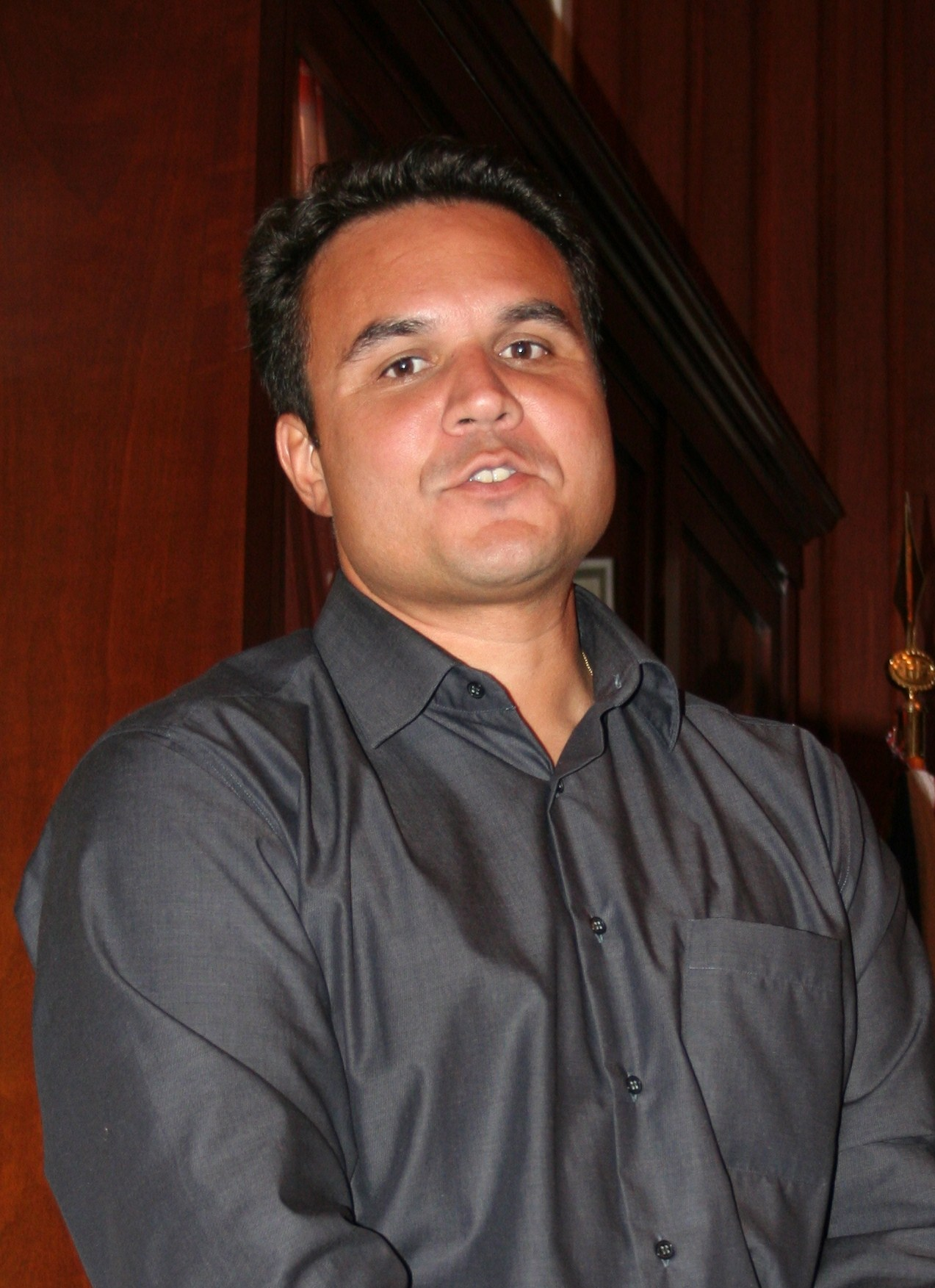

President of the Regional Council of Réunion
- In office 26 March 2010 – 2 July 2021
- Preceded by: Paul Vergès
- Succeeded by: Huguette Bello

Member of the French Senate for Réunion
- In office 2014–2017
- Preceded by: Jacqueline Farreyrol

Personal details
- Born: 26 April 1964 (age 62) Saint-Pierre, Réunion
- Party: The Republicans
- Education: University of Limoges

Didier Robert (born 26 April 1964) is a French politician who served as President of the Regional Council of Réunion from 2010 to 2021, and as a member of the National Assembly for Réunion's 3rd constituency.

== Early life and education ==
Didier Robert was born in Saint-Pierre, Réunion, on 26 April 1964, to Anthony Robert and Jocelyn Clairivet. His father was a police officer and his mother was a teacher. He graduated from the University of Limoges with a diploma in business and administration management in 1983, and with a bachelor's degree in economic and social administration in 1985.

== Career ==
In 1987, Robert started working as a social and legal secretariat in Le Tampon's town hall. He was the director of Compagnie Générale Automobile, a company owned by the family of André Thien Ah Koon, from 1989 to 1990. He worked as chief of staff for Koon during his time as mayor of Le Tampon from 1991 to 1998, and also for Alain Bénard, the mayor of Saint-Paul, Réunion, from 2000 to 2005.

In the 2001 election Robert was elected as deputy mayor of Le Tampon as a part of Koon's electoral list. He was elected mayor after Koon resigned. In the 2007 election Robert won a seat in the National Assembly for Réunion's 3rd constituency.

Robert, a member of The Republicans, defeated President Paul Vergès, founder of the Communist Party of Réunion, in the 2010 regional election. Robert was chosen by the Union for a Popular Movement to lead it for the 2015 regional election. The alliance he led defeated Huguette Bello and held 29 seats on the Regional Council of Réunion compared to Bello's 16.

== Works cited ==
=== News ===
- "Régionales à La Réunion : Didier Robert (LR) largement reconduit". Le Parisien. 13 December 2015. Archived from the original on 9 April 2025.
- "Régionales: Didier Robert officiellement investi par l'UMP". Imaz Press Réunion. 17 April 2015. Archived from the original on 9 July 2025.
- "Robert Didier". Réunionnais du monde. 1 January 2014. Archived from the original on 10 July 2025.

=== Web ===
- "Biography Didier Robert". L'Internaute. Archived from the original on 23 January 2019.
- "ÉLECTIONS LÉGISLATIVES DES 10 ET 17 JUIN 2007". National Assembly. Archived from the original on 10 July 2025.
- "Résultats par commune". National Assembly. Archived from the original on 14 May 2025.
