= Jean-Hugues Ratenon =

French politician

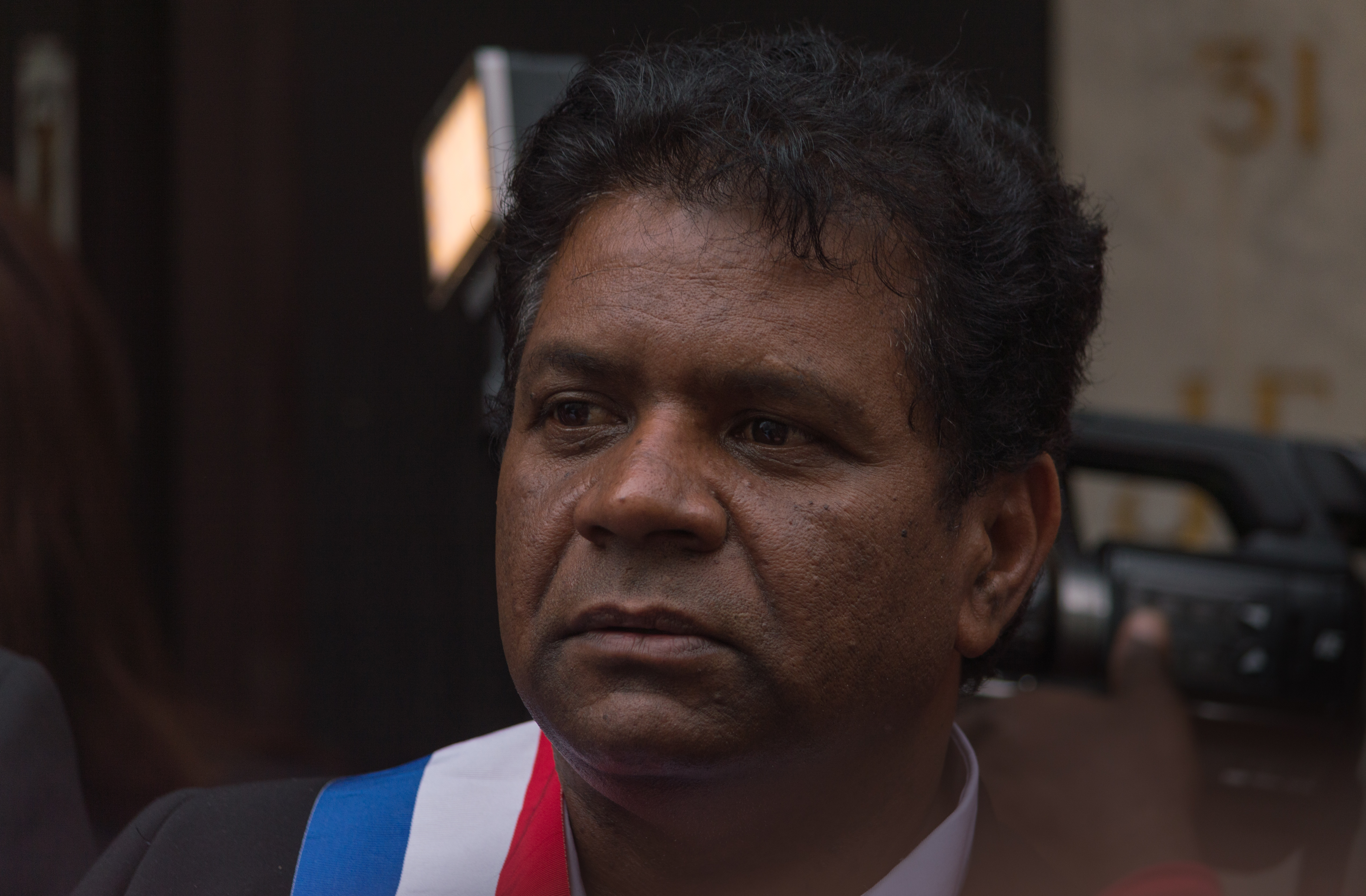

Member of the National Assembly for Réunion's 5th constituency
- Incumbent
- Assumed office 21 June 2017
- Preceded by: Jean-Claude Fruteau

Personal details
- Born: 25 June 1967 (age 58) Saint-Benoît, Réunion, France
- Party: La France Insoumise

Jean-Hugues Ratenon (born 25 June 1967) is a French politician representing Rézistans Égalité 974. He was elected to the French National Assembly on 18 June 2017, representing the department of La Réunion. He was re-elected in 2022.

== See also ==
- 2017 French legislative election
