= Perceval Gaillard =

French politician

Member of the National Assembly for Réunion's 7th constituency
- Incumbent
- Assumed office 22 June 2022
- Preceded by: Jean-Luc Poudroux

Personal details
- Born: 24 April 1983 (age 42) Rouen, France
- Party: La France Insoumise
- Occupation: politician

Perceval Gaillard (born 24 April 1983) is a French politician from La France Insoumise. He was elected member of the National Assembly for Réunion's 7th constituency in the 2022 French legislative election.

== Biography ==
He moved to Reunion Island at the age of 19, where he worked as a laborer, mason and handler at the port, unloading containers. Elected on Huguette Bello's list in Saint-Paul for the 2020 municipal elections, he is the thirteenth deputy mayor in charge of city policy and the fight against illiteracy. He is a member of the party Rézistan's Égalité 974, founded by Jean-Hugues Ratenon and close to La France insoumise.

On 19 June 2022 he was elected deputy in the seventh constituency of Reunion Island under the label "Divers gauche". He became the first "zorey" (metropolitan) deputy of the island since Michel Debré, deputy between 1963 and 1988. He joined the group La France insoumise - Nouvelle Union populaire écologique et sociale (LFI-NUPES) in the National Assembly, alongside Jean-Hugues Ratenon.

== See also ==
- List of deputies of the 16th National Assembly of France
