= Thierry Robert =

French politician (born 1977)

Member of the National Assembly for Réunion's 7th constituency
- In office 2012–2018
- Succeeded by: Jean-Luc Poudroux

Mayor of Saint-Leu
- In office 2008–2017
- Preceded by: Jean-Luc Poudroux
- Succeeded by: Bruno Domen

Personal details
- Born: Thierry Jean Bernard Robert; 1 April 1977 (age 49) Saint-Denis, France
- Party: MoDem

Thierry Jean Bernard Robert (French: [tjɛʁi ʁɔbɛʁ]; born 1 April 1977) is a French politician who was elected to the French National Assembly on 17 June 2012 representing the Department of Réunion.

He has been the mayor of Saint-Leu since 2008.
