= Karine Lebon =

French politician

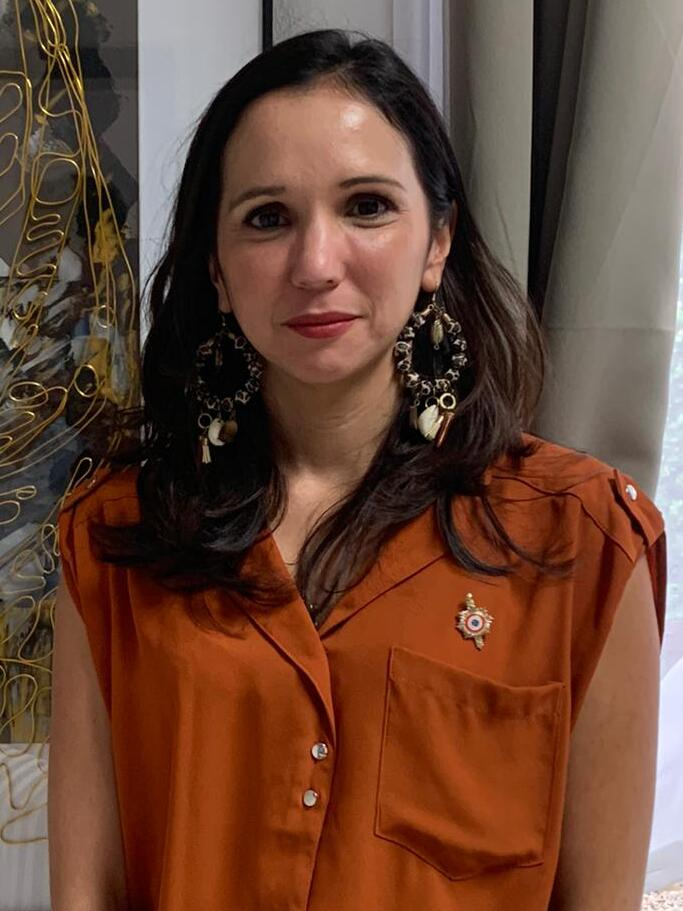

Deputy of the French National Assembly for Réunion's 2nd constituency
- Incumbent
- Assumed office 27 September 2020
- Preceded by: Olivier Hoarau

Personal details
- Born: 9 June 1985 (age 40) Saint-Denis, Réunion, France
- Party: Pour La Réunion

Karine Lebon (born 9 June 1985) is a French politician and former actress and teacher. She is the Member of Parliament for Réunion's 2nd constituency.

== Career ==
Lebon was elected in September 2020, under the Pour La Réunion banner, replacing Huguette Bello who resigned. She sits in the Democratic and Republican Left group in Parliament. She was re-elected in the 2022 National Assembly election.
