= Regional Council of Réunion =

Deliberating assembly of the region of Réunion

The Regional Council of Réunion consists of 45 members.

== Organization and composition ==
=== Regional assembly ===
Regional councillors of Réunion
Party	Acronym	Elected members	Group
Majority (29 seats)
Miscellaneous left	DVG	10	
Pour La Réunion	PLR	6	
Communist Party of Réunion	PCR	3	
La France Insoumise	LFI	2	
Socialist Party	PS	2	
Banian	Ba.	2	
Territories of Progress	TdP	1	
Action populaire de La Réunion	APR	1	
Mouvement citoyen réunionnais	MCR	1	
Endemik Réunion	ER	1	
Opposition (16 seats)
Miscellaneous right	DVD	7	
Objectif Réunion	OR	4	
The Republicans	LR	2	
Union of Democrats and Independents	UDI	1	
France Réunion Avenir	FRA	1	
Miscellaneous centre	DVC	1	

=== Presidency ===
Since 2 July 2021, the President of the Regional Council of Réunion has been Huguette Bello.

In office		Name	Party
Presidents of the Regional Public Institution
1973	1978	Marcel Cerneau	UDF
1978	1983	Yves Barau	RPR
Presidents of the Regional Council
1983	1986	Mario Hoarau	PCR
1986	1992	Pierre Lagourgue	RPR-UDF
1992	1993	Camille Sudre	Free Dom
1993	1998	Margie Sudre	DVD
1998	2010	Paul Vergès	PCR
2010	2021	Didier Robert	UMP-LR (2010–2018)
2010	2021	Didier Robert	OR
2021	Incumbent	Huguette Bello	PLR
