= Rézistans Égalité 974 =

Political party on Réunion

Rézistans Égalité 974 (RÉ974) is a political party on the Indian Ocean island of Réunion. The party is named after the postal codes of the capital Saint-Denis, which are in the 97400 range.

The party was founded in 2016 and is allied with the French mainland left-wing party La France Insoumise. Jean-Hugues Ratenon sits as the party's only Member of Parliament in the National Assembly of France.

== Electoral record ==
Year	1st round		Rank	2nd round		Seats	Government
Year	Votes	%	Rank	Votes	%	Seats	Government
2017	4,160	1.53	11th ^{_}	14,056	6.82	1 / 7	Opposition
2022	9,345	36.38	NUPES	17,748	62.81	1 / 7	Opposition
