= For Réunion (political party) =

Left wing political party on Réunion

For Réunion Pour La Réunion
- Abbreviation: PLR
- President: Huguette Bello
- Founder: Huguette Bello
- Founded: 13 May 2012
- Split from: Communist Party of Réunion
- Headquarters: Saint-Paul, Réunion
- Membership (2023): 1,100
- Ideology: Post-Marxism; Réunionese regionalism Democratic socialism Soft Euroscepticism
- Political position: Left-wing
- National affiliation: New Popular Front (2024–present); NUPES (2022–2024)
- Colours: Purple
- National Assembly (Réunionese seats): 2 / 7
- Senate (Réunionese seats): 1 / 4
- Regional Council of Réunion: 6 / 45
- Mayors of Réunion: 1 / 24

For Réunion (French: Pour La Réunion [puʁ la ʁeynjɔ̃], PLR) is a left-wing political party in Réunion, an overseas department of France. It is led by Huguette Bello.

== History ==
The party was founded in 2012, after a split with the Communist Party of Réunion. They endorsed Jean-Luc Mélenchon in the 2017 French presidential election.

The party was part of the New Ecological and Social People's Union alliance for the 2022 French legislative election and the New Popular Front for the 2024 French legislative election.

== Ideology ==
For Réunion is a socialist party which has been classed as post-Marxist.

== Leadership ==
The party is led by Huguette Bello.

== Elected representatives ==
- Karine Lebon, Member of the French Parliament
- Frédéric Maillot, Member of the French Parliament
