= 2512 =

Magazine in Réunion

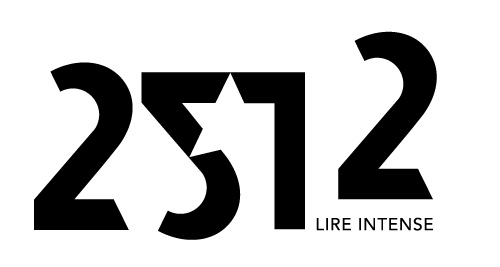
- Editor-in-chief: David-Alexandre Techer
- Categories: News magazine
- Frequency: Monthly
- Circulation: 5,000
- First issue: March 3, 1923
- Company: L'Ours et la Prose
- Country: France
- Language: French
- Website: www.2512.re
- ISSN: 1954-1295

2512 is a monthly news magazine published in Réunion. Its name refers to the size in square kilometres of this French overseas department, which is located in the Indian Ocean.

== Editorial content ==
=== Columns ===
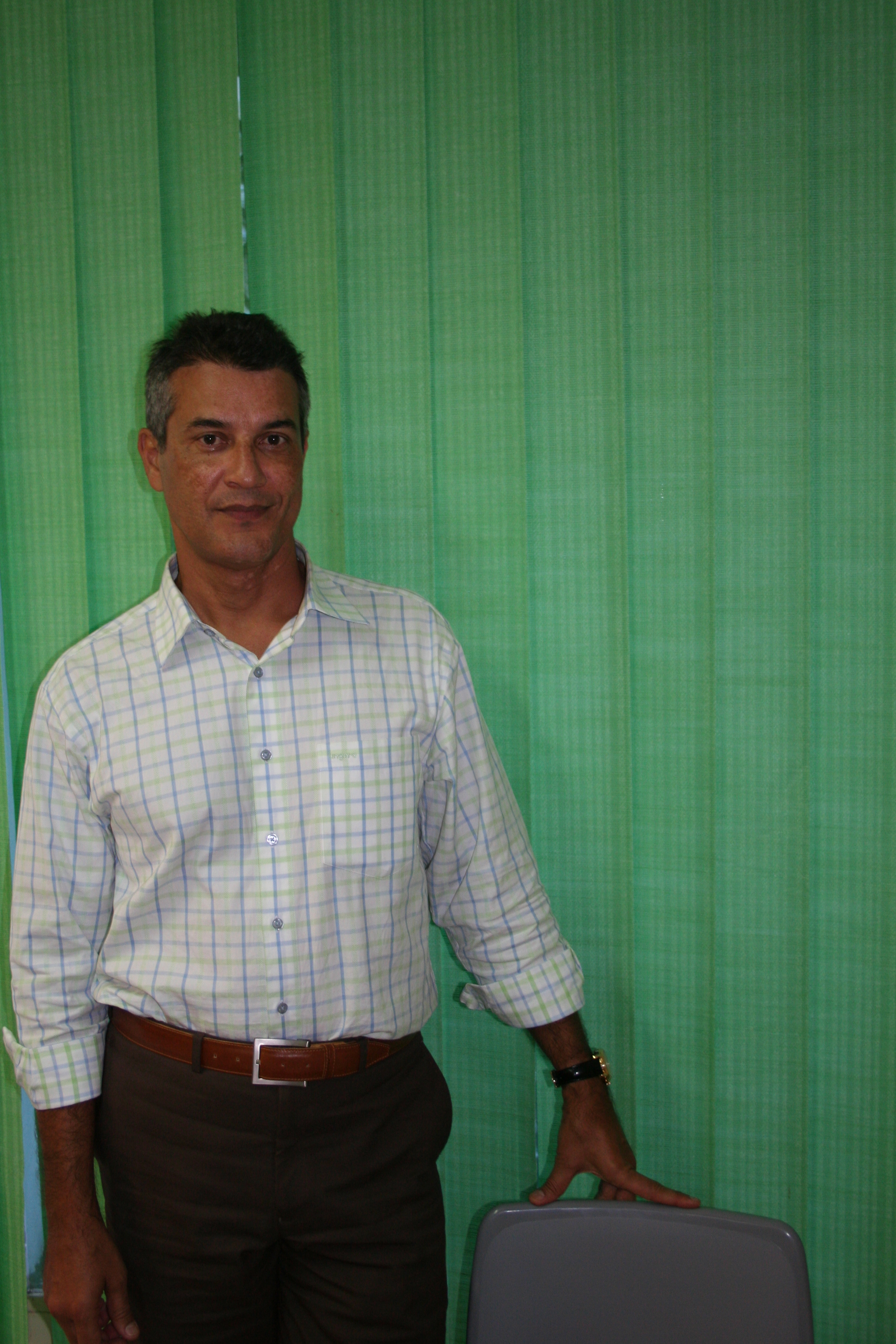
A photo of Ibrahim Dindar taken for the political section.

Besides the daily press, 2512 is the only generalist publication in Réunion since a competitor, founded several months earlier, went bankrupt in December 2006. Its content varies greatly. Certain columns appear on a regular basis, such as those on the media or the environment.

Although the editorial staff is only small, it prepares a dossier on a particular theme each month. Subjects that have been treated include: the mobility of the inhabitants of Réunion beyond their island, their relationships to their bodies, and their driving habits.

=== Articles ===
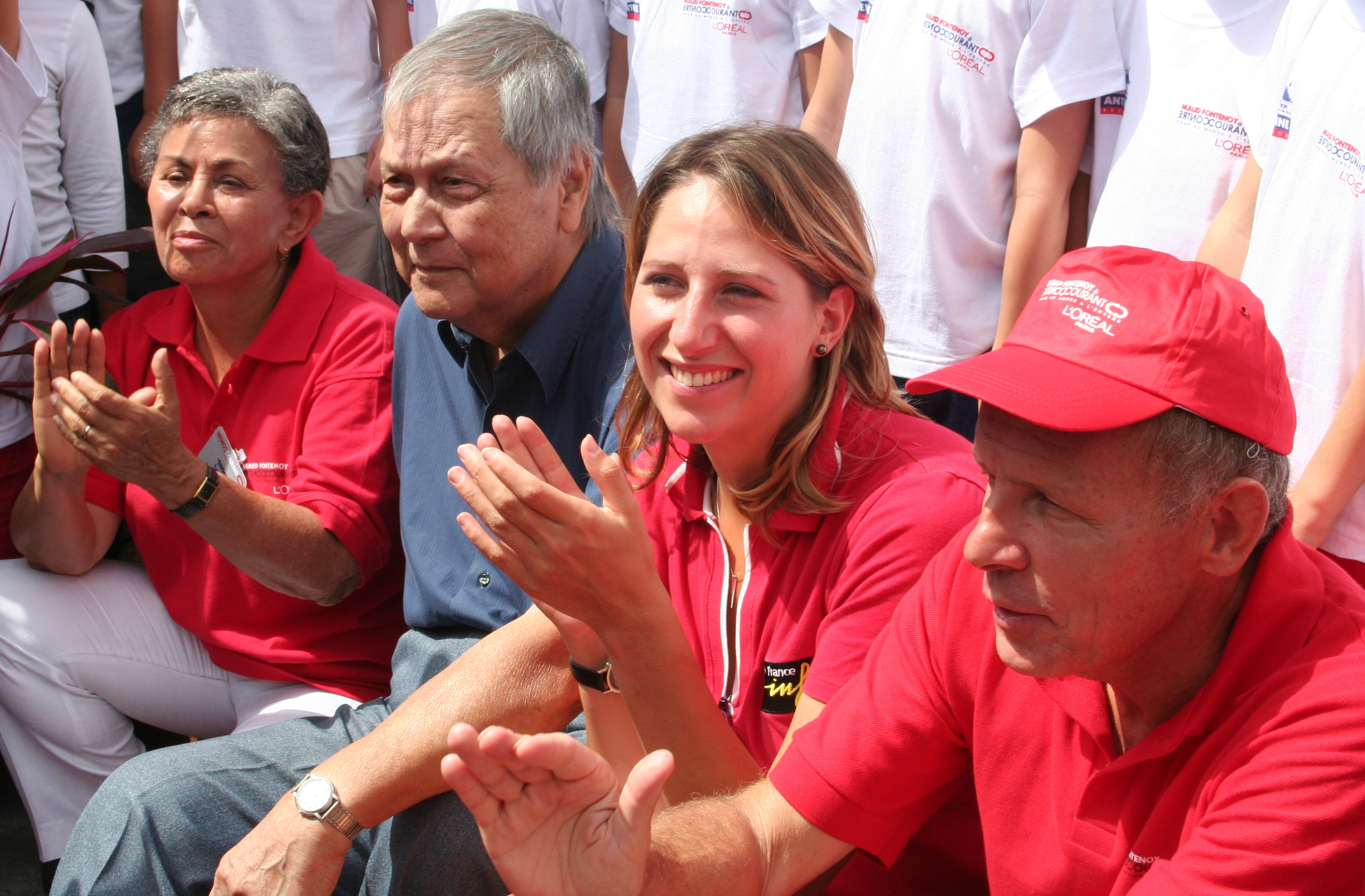
Paul Vergès, Maud Fontenoy and Patrick Poivre d'Arvor at Port de la Pointe des Galets, 15 October 2006.

In general, a lot of space in the dossier and in the rest of the magazine is dedicated to interviews with local, national and international personalities. The journalists of 2512 have interviewed Xavier Bertrand, Ibrahim Dindar, Nassimah Dindar, Joëlle Écormier, Maud Fontenoy, Meddy Gerville, Johnny Griffin, Olivier Ker Ourio, Patricia Machado, Émilie Minatchy, Nathalie Natiembé, Monique Orphé, Patrick Poivre d'Arvor, Gilbert Pounia, Didier Robert, Jacques Robert, Natasha Saint-Pier, Louis Schweitzer, Davy Sicard, Paul Vergès and Firmin Viry, the singer.

== Description ==
=== Cover ===
The cover of 2512 includes a frame with all important information. The logo appears at the top of the lefthand side of the page, just below the words "Lire intense" (intense reading), a play on the old slogan used to attract tourists to Réunion: "L'île intense" (the intense island). The main title and an image occupy the rest of the page. The back cover is sold as advertising space.

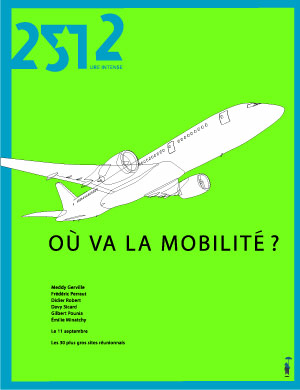
Cover of the first edition

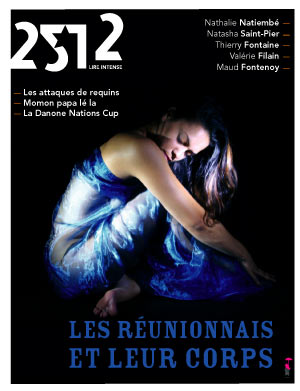
Cover of the edition on the body

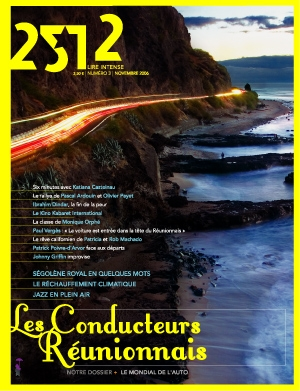
Cover of the edition on road safety

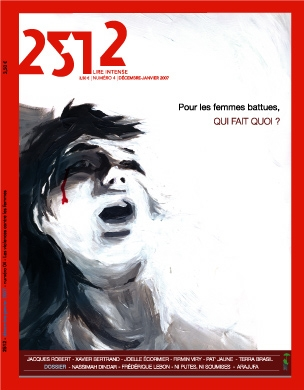
Cover of the edition on domestic violence

=== Magazine ===
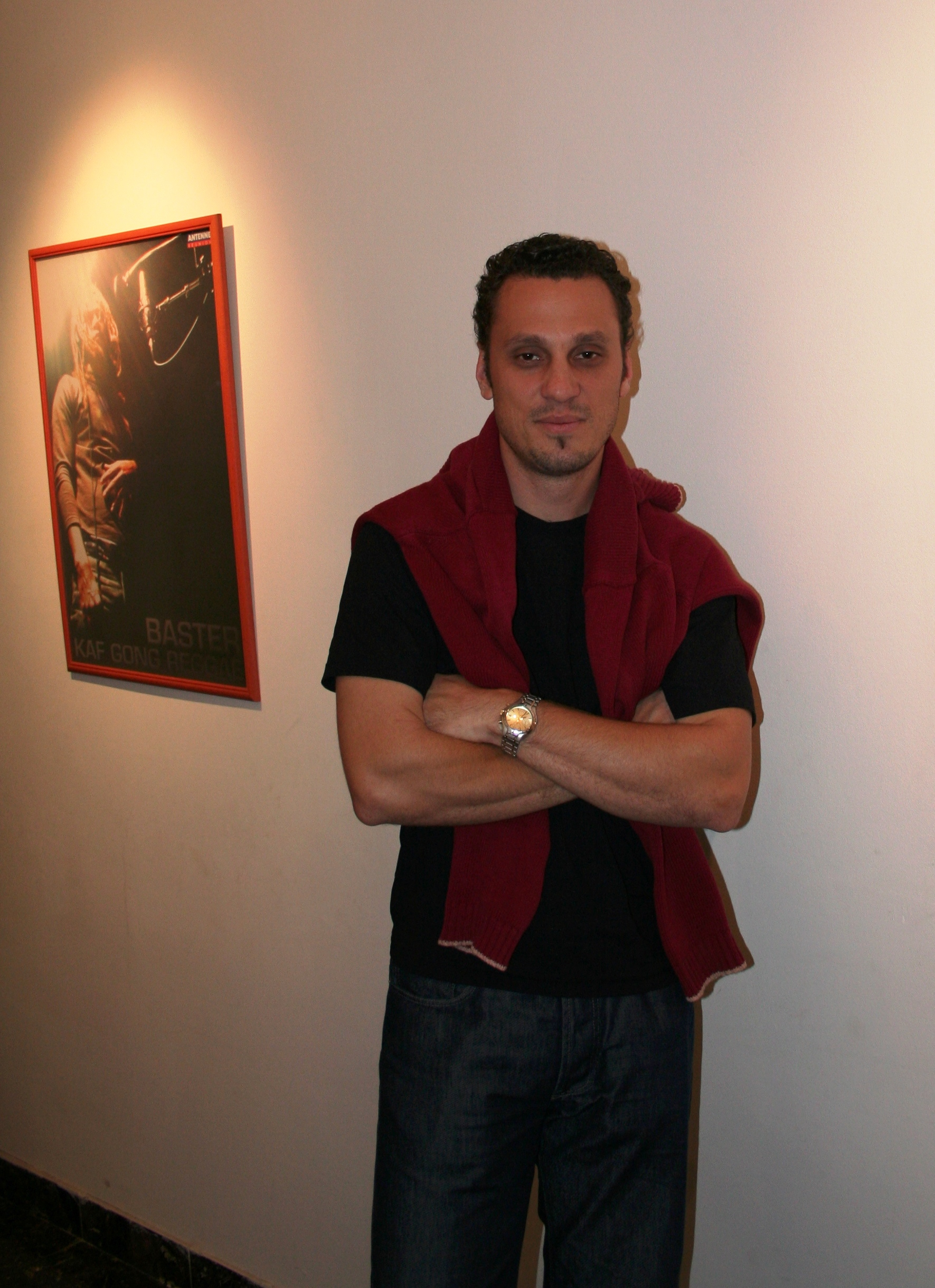
A photo of Meddy Gerville taken for the notebook section of 2512.

Each edition of 2512 is divided into three sections:

- The review, which contains a diverse multitude of columns, with several regular ones.
- The dossier, which includes a series of articles and illustrations about the topic presented on the cover. This section begins with a double page photograph complemented by a summary.
- The notebook, which concentrates on cultural news. This section begins with a mosaic of photographs spread across a double page.

== Production ==
=== Publisher ===
The magazine is published by a printing house, L'Ours et la Prose, a limited liability company with shares worth 21,000 euros. It is located at 112 rue Sainte-Marie, in Saint-Denis. The three shareholders and co-directors are Thierry Caro, Stéphane Cazanove and David-Alexandre Techer.

An alumnus of the Institut d'études politiques de Lille, Caro was for one year the editor-in-chief and the director of publication. Cazanove was previously a physical education teacher at a private college in the island's capital city. He is the commercial director. Techer is the artistic director.

=== Printing and distribution ===
Most editions were printed in Mauritius by the enterprise Précigraph, which is based at Pailles. Currently, the printer Ah-Sing in Réunion has since taken over the operation. 2512 is printed in a format which is slightly smaller than A4, and usually has more than 80 pages.

The magazine targets those interested in culture, young people and public servants. It is sold for €3.50 and is distributed to all the principal points of sale in Réunion by the Agence réunionnaise de distribution de la presse, a local subsidiary of Nouvelles Messageries de la Presse Parisienne, which holds a monopoly over this market in Réunion.
