= News media =

Elements of mass media that focus on delivering news

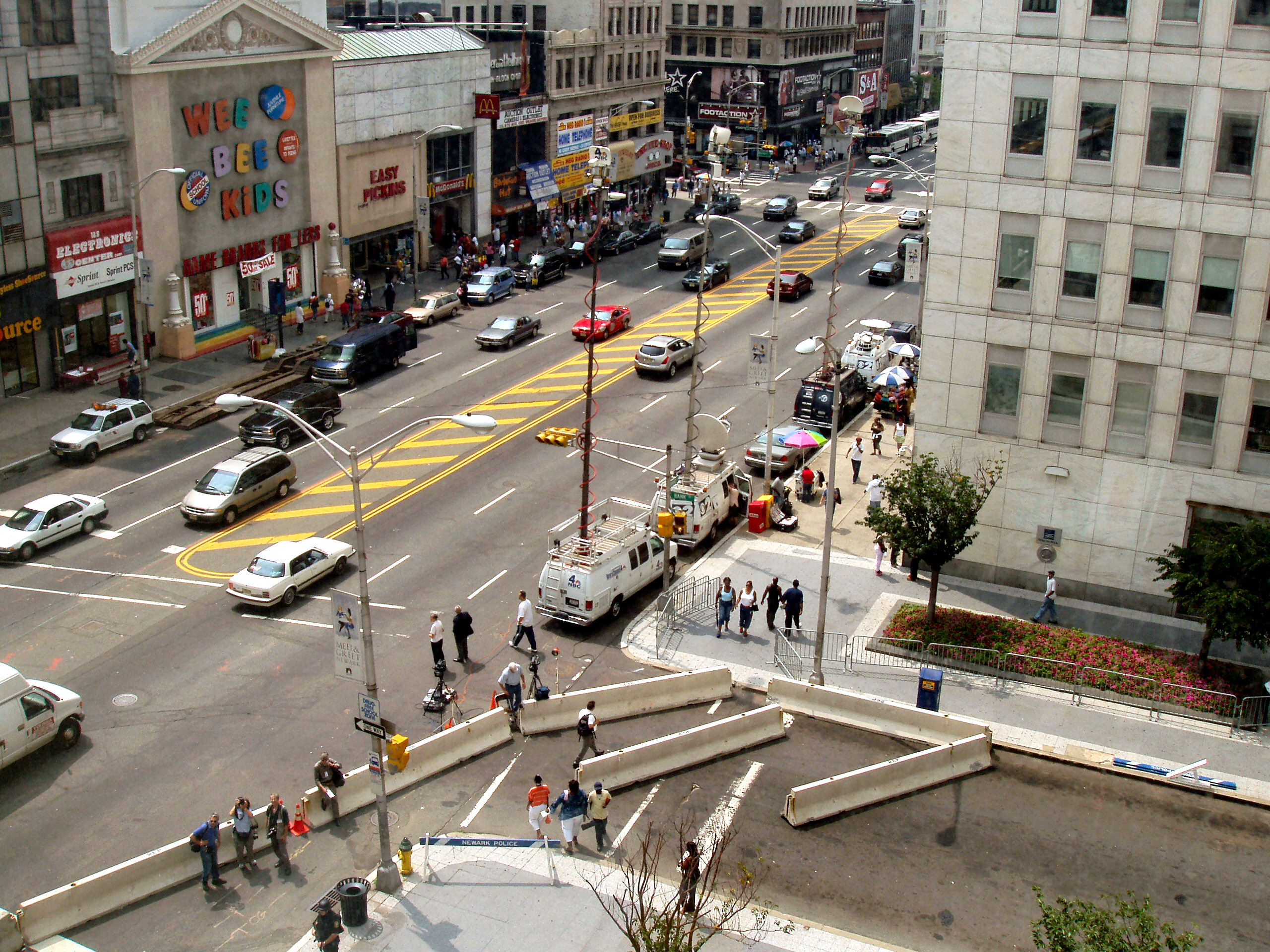
Electronic news-gathering trucks and photojournalists gathered outside the Prudential Financial headquarters in Newark, United States in August 2004 following the announcement of evidence of a terrorist threat to it and to buildings in New York City.

The news media or news industry are forms of mass media that focus on delivering news to the general public. These sources include news agencies, newspapers, news magazines, news channels, etc.

== History ==
Some of the first news circulations occurred in Renaissance Europe. These handwritten newsletters, circulated among merchants, contained news about wars, economic conditions, and social customs. Newsletters were very scarce and no two were the same as they were all handwritten, until the invention of the printing press by Johannes Gutenberg in 1440. With movable type and ink, newspapers were now able to be mass produced for cheap. The first printed news appeared by the late 1400s in German pamphlets, which contained content that was often highly sensationalized. The first newspaper written in English was The Weekly News, published in London in 1621. Several papers followed in the 1640s and 1650s. In 1690, the first American newspaper was published by Richard Pierce and Benjamin Harris in Boston. However, it did not have permission from the government to be published and was immediately suppressed.

=== In the United States ===
In 1729, Benjamin Franklin began writing a new form of newspaper that was more satirical and involved in civic affairs than previously seen. In 1735, John Peter Zenger was accused of seditious libel by the governor of New York, William Cosby. Zenger was found not guilty, largely in part due to his attorney Andrew Hamilton. Hamilton later wrote a paper in which he argued that newspapers should be free to criticize the government as long as it was true. Later, with the ratification of the Bill of Rights in 1791, freedom of the press would be guaranteed by the First Amendment.

In the 1830s, newspapers started seeking commercial success and turned toward reportage, beginning with the New York Sun in 1833. Advancements in technology made it cheaper to print newspapers and "penny papers" emerged. These issues sought out more entertaining daily news like murder and adventure, rather than politics. Penny papers attempted to reach a larger audience due to the low prices.

By the end of the century, modern aspects of newspapers such as banner headlines, extensive use of illustrations, "funny pages," and expanded coverage of organized sporting events began to appear. Media consolidation emerged with many independent newspapers becoming part of "chains".

The early 1900s saw Progressive Era journalists using a new style of investigative journalism that revealed the corrupt practices of government officials. These exposing articles became featured in many newspapers and magazines. Those who wrote them were labeled as "muckrakers". They became very influential and were a vital force in the Progressive reform movement. However, after 1912, muckraking declined. The public began to think the exposés were sensationalized, but they did make a great impact on future policies.

In the early 1920s, radios became accessible and allowed large audiences to simultaneously listen to breaking news. Advertisers jumped on the opportunity to persuade the millions of captive listeners.

With the introduction of television came the Communications Act of 1934. It was an agreement between commercial television and the people of the United States that established that 1. The airways are public property. 2. Commercial broadcasters are licensed to use the airways. 3. The main condition for use will be whether the broadcaster served "the public interest, convenience, and necessity".

Television news continued to expand during the 1970s. By 1990, more than half of American homes had cable systems and nationally oriented newspapers expanded their reach. With technological advancements in the newsroom, notably the Internet, a new emphasis on computer-assisted reporting and a new blending of media forms emerged, with one reporter preparing the same story in print, online, and on camera for a newspaper's cable station.

== Etymology ==
A "medium" (plural "media") is a carrier of something. Common things carried by the media include information, art, or physical objects. A medium may provide transmission or storage of information, or both. The industries which produce news and entertainment content for the mass media are often called "the media" (in much the same way the newspaper industry is called "the press"). In the late 20th century it became commonplace for this usage to be construed as singular ("The media is...") rather than as the traditional plural.

"Press" is the collective designation of media vehicles that carry out journalism and other functions of informative communication, in contrast to pure propaganda or entertainment communication. The term press comes from the printing press.

== Broadcasting ==
Broadcasting is the distribution of audio and video signals (programs) to a number of recipients (listeners or viewers). This group may be the public in general, or a relatively large audience within the public. Broadcasting forms a very large segment of the mass media. Television and radio programs are distributed through radio broadcasting or cable, often simultaneously. By coding signals and having decoding equipment in homes, the latter also enables subscription-based channels and pay-per-view services. The sequencing of content in a broadcast is called a schedule. A broadcasting organization may broadcast several programs at the same time, through several channels (frequencies), for example BBC One and Two. On the other hand, two or more organizations may share a channel and each uses it during a fixed part of the day. Digital radio and digital television may also transmit multiplexed programming, with several channels compressed into one ensemble.

=== Television ===
In television or broadcast journalism, news analysts (also called newscasters or news anchors) examine, interpret, and broadcast news received from various sources of information. Anchors present this as news, either videotaped or live, through transmissions from on-the-scene reporters (news correspondents).

News films, or "clips," can vary in length. Some may be as long as ten minutes and others may need to fit in all the relevant information and material in two or three minutes. News channels have also begun to host special documentary films that are of much longer duration and able to explore a news subject or issue in greater detail.

News stories are categorized with various formats according to the merit of the story. Such formats include AVO, AVO Byte, Pkg, VO SOT, VOX POP, and Ancho Visual.

- The AVO, or Anchor Voice Over, is the short form of news. The story is written in a gist. According to the script the visual is edited. The anchor reads the news while the visual is broadcast simultaneously. Generally, the duration of an AVO is 30 to 40 seconds. The script is three to four lines. At first the anchor starts to read the news, and, after reading one or one-and-a-half lines, the visual is aired, overlapping the face of anchor.
- The AVO Byte has two parts: An AVO and one or more bytes. This is the same as an AVO, except that as soon as the AVO ends, the Byte is aired.
- The Pkg has three parts: Anchor, Voice Over, and Sign Off. At first a Script is written. A voice-over anchor reads the anchor or anchor intro part.

== Newspapers ==
A newspaper is a lightweight and disposable publication (more specifically, a periodical), usually printed on low-cost paper called newsprint. It may be general or of special interest, and may be published daily, weekly, biweekly, monthly, bimonthly, or quarterly.

General-interest newspapers are usually journals of current news on a variety of topics. Those can include political events, crime, business, sports, and opinions (either editorials, columns, or political cartoons). Many also include weather news and forecasts. Newspapers increasingly use photographs to illustrate stories; they also often include comic strips and other entertainment, such as crosswords.

=== Print journalism ===
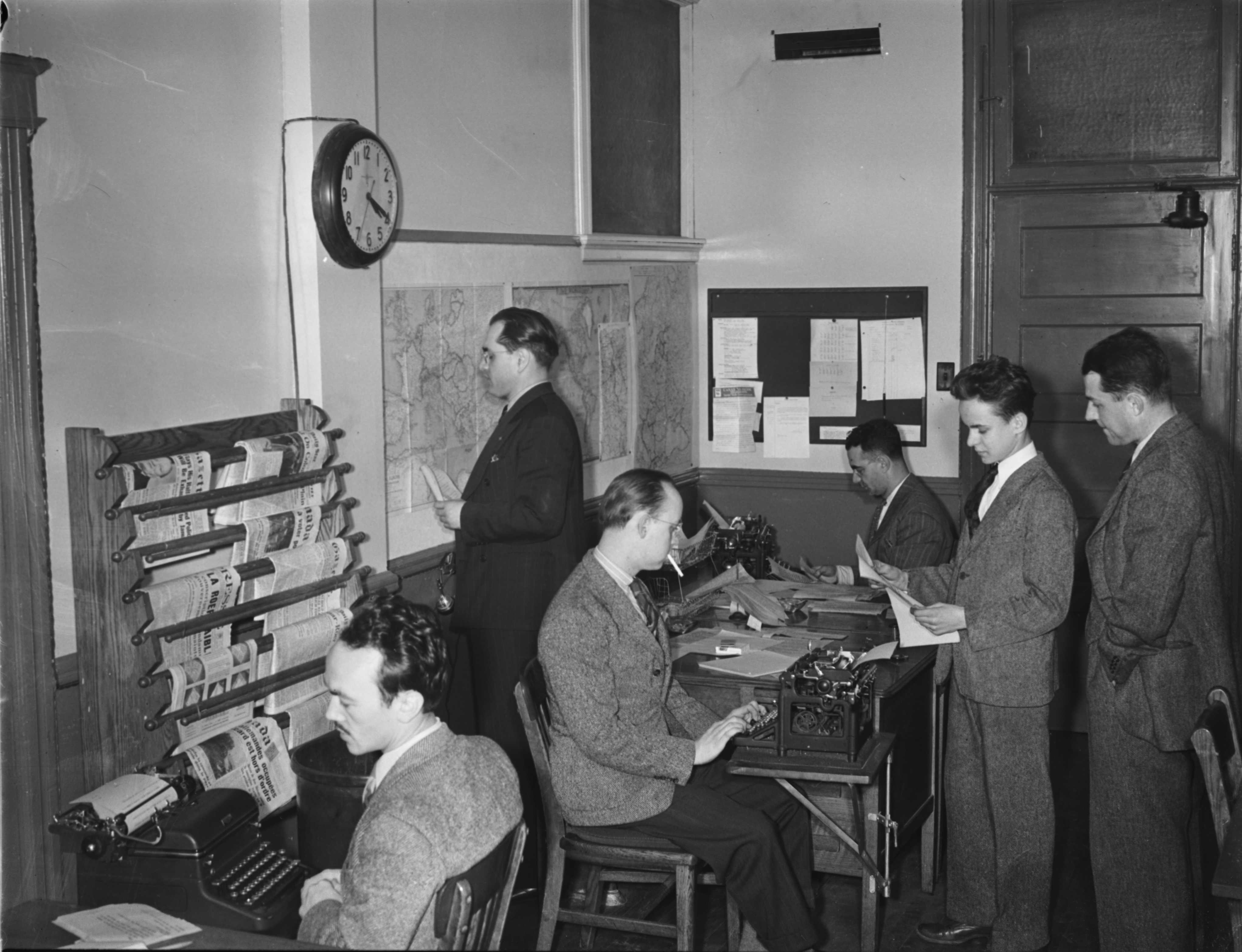
Journalists at work in Montreal in the 1940s

A story is a single article, news, item or feature, usually concerning a single event, issue, theme, or profile of a person. Correspondents report news occurring in the main, locally, from their own country, or from foreign cities where they are stationed.

Most reporters file information or write their stories electronically from remote locations. In many cases, breaking stories are written by staff members, through information collected and submitted by other reporters who are out in the field gathering information for an event that has just occurred and needs to be broadcast instantly. Radio and television reporters often compose stories and report "live" from the scene. Some journalists also interpret the news or offer opinions and analysis to readers, viewers, or listeners. In this role, they are called commentators or columnists.

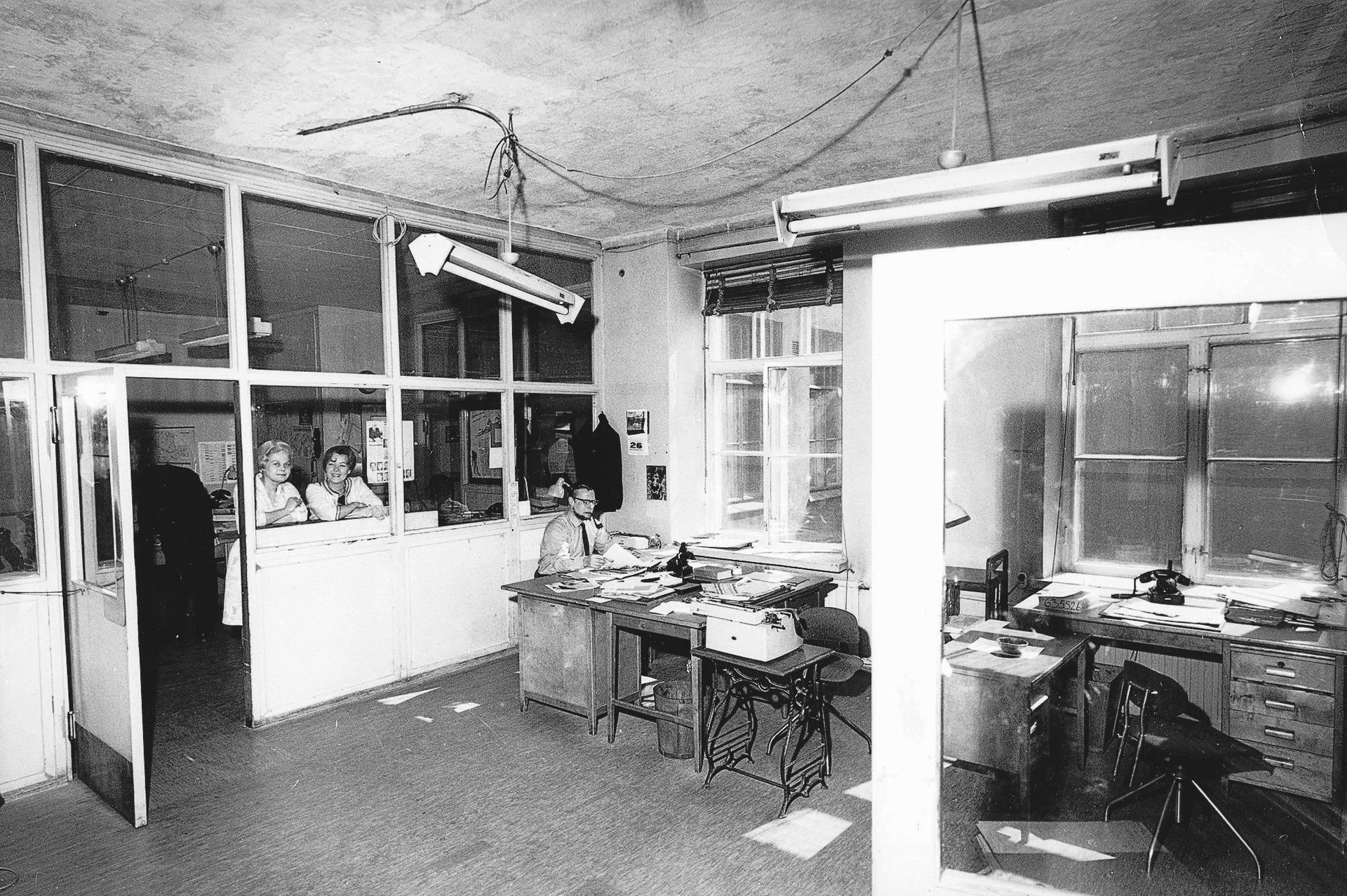
The editor's office (Newsroom) of the Helsingin Sanomat in 1965

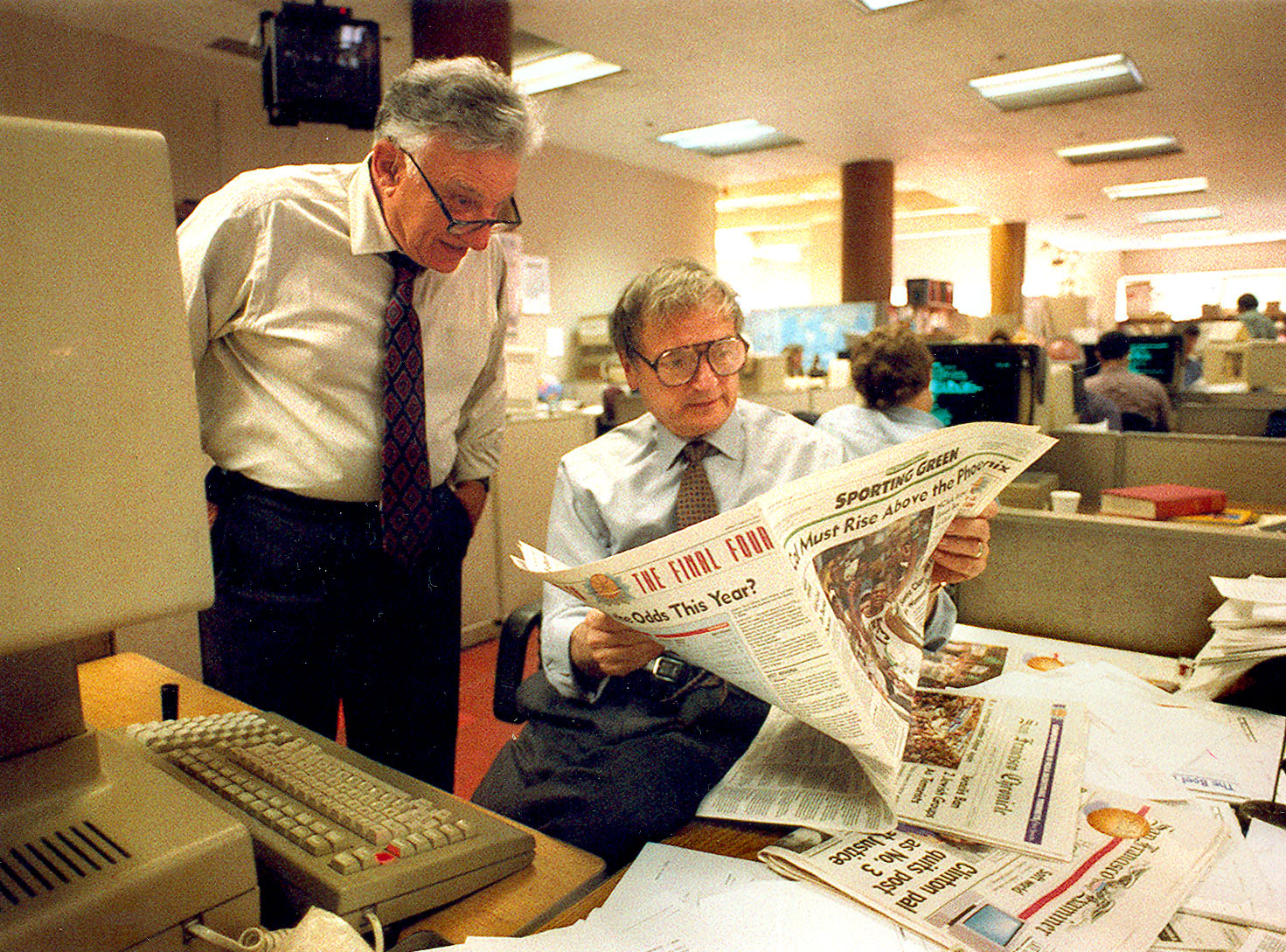
Bill German, editor emeritus and Page One editor Jack Breibart in the newsroom of the San Francisco Chronicle in 1994

Reporters take notes and photographs or videos, either on their own, by citizens, or through a photographer. In the second phase, they organize the material, determine the focus or emphasis (identify the peg), and write their stories. The story is then edited by news or copy-editors (U.S. style) or sub-editors in Europe, who function from the news desk. The headline of the story is decided by the news desk. Often, the news desk also heavily rewrites or changes the style and tone of the first draft prepared. Finally, a collection of stories that have been picked for the newspaper or magazine edition, is laid out on dummy (trial) pages, and after the chief editor has approved the content, style and language in the material, it is sent for publishing. The writer is given a byline for the piece that is published; his or her name appears alongside the article. This process takes place according to the frequency of the publication. News can be published in a variety of formats (broadsheet, tabloid, magazine and periodical publications) as well as periods (daily, weekly, semi-weekly, fortnightly or monthly).

== Newsmagazines ==
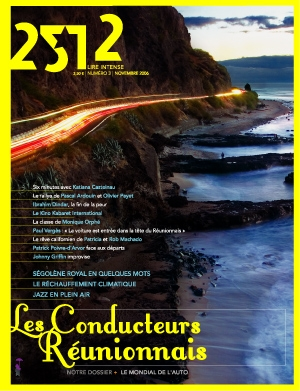
Cover of 2512, a monthly newsmagazine published in Réunion

A newsmagazine is a weekly magazine featuring articles on current events. These magazines generally go more in-depth into stories than newspapers, trying to give the reader an understanding of the context surrounding important events, rather than just the facts. For example, TIME magazine is a NYC based weekly newsmagazine that is known for its in-depth articles on current events, politics, science, and more. TIME, with an audience of 100 million people, has built a brand on trust and authority.

== Newsreels ==
A newsreel was a documentary film common in the first half of the 20th century, that regularly released in a public presentation place containing filmed news stories.

Created by Pathé Frères of France in 1908, this form of film was a staple of the typical North American, British, and Commonwealth countries (especially Canada, Australia and New Zealand). Newsreels were popular throughout European cinema programming schedules from the silent era until the 1960s when television news broadcasting completely supplanted their role. Due to television news, the popularity of newsreels began to decline, and they were eventually phased out altogether.

== Online journalism ==
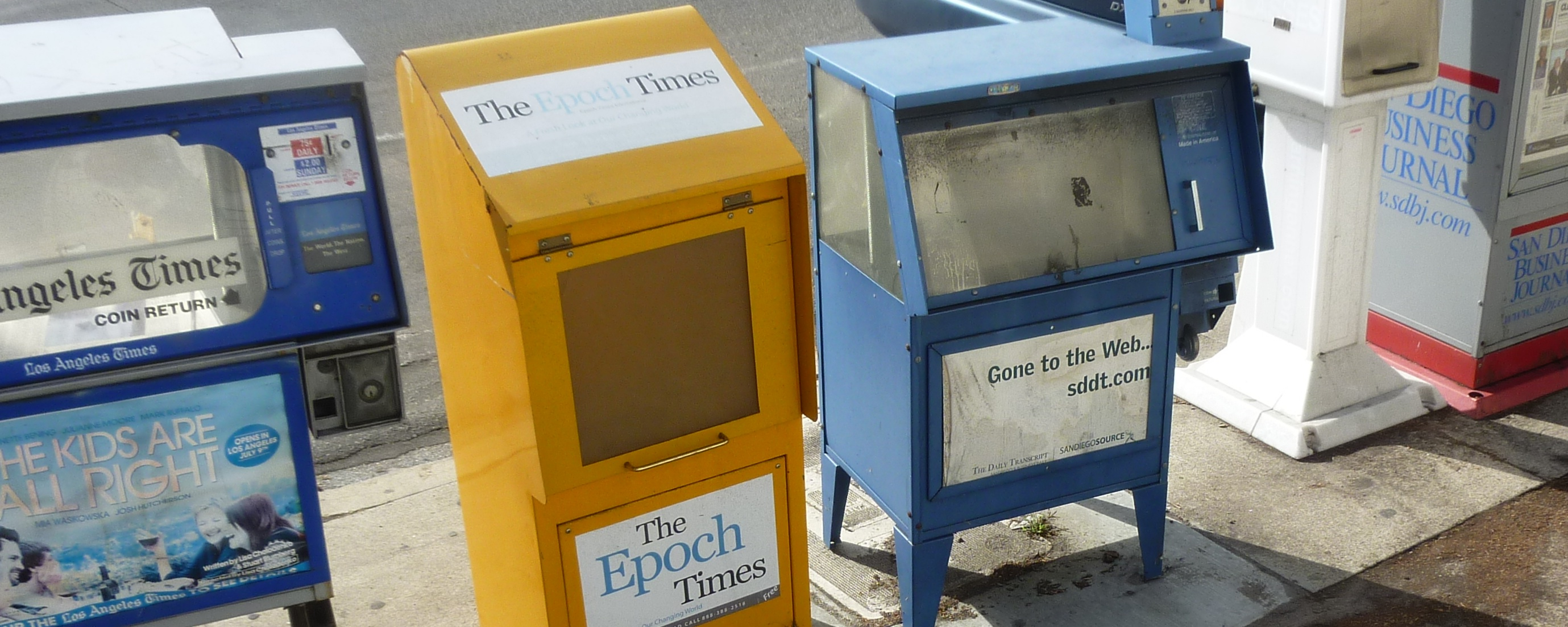
Newspaper "gone to the Web" in California

Online journalism, otherwise known as digital journalism, is the reporting of news produced or distributed via the Internet. The Internet has allowed the formal and informal publication of news stories. Online journalism can be published by professional writers and journalists through mainstream media websites and outlets. Or, news can be published by citizens, through blogs, vlogs, and social media.

== News coverage ==
By covering news, politics, weather, sports, entertainment, and vital events, the daily media shape the dominant cultural, social and political picture of society. Due to the rise of social media involvement in news, the most common news value has become entertainment in recent years. Apropos of this was Robert F. Kennedy Jr.'s 11,000-word Rolling Stone article apropos of the 2004 United States presidential election, published June 1, 2006. By June 8, there had been no mainstream coverage of the documented allegations by President John F. Kennedy's nephew. On June 9, this sub-story was covered by a Seattle Post-Intelligencer article.

Media coverage during the 2008 Mumbai attacks highlighted the use of new media and Internet social networking tools, including Twitter and Flickr, in spreading information about the attacks, observing that Internet coverage was often ahead of more traditional media sources. In response, traditional media outlets included such coverage in their reports. However, several outlets were criticized as they did not check for the reliability and verifiability of the information. Some public opinion research companies have found that a majority or plurality of people in various countries distrust the news media.

=== Social media ===
People have a lot of options when it comes to choosing their consumption of news, and many are increasingly turning to social media. Over half of U.S. adults, 54%, get some of their news from social media, according to a Pew Research Center survey from September 2024. The two most popular sources are Facebook and YouTube, as 33% and 32% of users learn information from these sources, with Instagram and TikTok following close at 20% and 17%. The director of news and information research at Pew Research Center, Katerina Eva Matsa, says people aren't just looking for facts when they seek out news, but also a sense of community. Social media groups and pages give them a sense of community, and are easily accessible, right at their fingertips. Also according to the Pew Research Center, Americans value the speed, novelty, format, and variety that the news on social media offers. Social media algorithms allow for users to see catered news and information to suit their likings and beliefs.

These algorithms have introduced users to social media news influencers that may resonate with them. "News influencers" have gained huge popularity in recent months, as almost 4 in 10 U.S. adults under 30, or 37%, regularly turn to them, according to another Pew Research Center study from November 2024. News influencers are defined as "individuals who have a large following on social media and often post about news or political or social issues". Users say they get basic facts, opinions, funny posts, and breaking news from their respective news influencers. Americans like to connect and resonate with those who agree with their opinions and beliefs, and getting news updates from their own corner of the internet is comforting and assuring to them. Some U.S. adults have also noted that news influencers have helped them better comprehend events and issues.

=== Fake news ===
Fake news articles are untruthful-on-purpose stories that purposely mislead the reader to think one way. With the rise of new media through social media (Facebook, YouTube, etc) there has been an increase in fake news due to the ability of anyone able to share and rapidly spread information. It can be tough to decipher whom to trust and whom not to. On the Internet, fake news articles can appear in the same search as truthful ones. This makes it hard for others to determine between what is fact and what is opinion. Research shows that one in five people regularly get news from social media influencers, especially younger audiences, which can increase exposure to misleading information. Specifically, the media coverage during the 2016 United States presidential election saw numerous misleading articles for both candidates.

== Media integrity ==
Media integrity refers to the ability of a news media outlet to serve the public interest and democratic process, making it resilient to institutional corruption within the media system, economy of influence, conflicting dependence and political clientelism. Media integrity encompasses the following qualities of a media outlet:

- independence from private or political interests
- transparency about own financial interests
- commitment to journalism ethics and standards
- responsiveness to citizens

The concept was devised particularly for the media systems in the region of South East Europe, within the project South East European Media Observatory, gathering organizations which are part of the South East European Network for Professionalization of Media (SEENPM).

== See also ==
- Court of public opinion
- Hostile media effect
- Media literacy
- Media regulation
- News presenter
- Yellow press
