= Gilbert Annette =

Malagasy politician

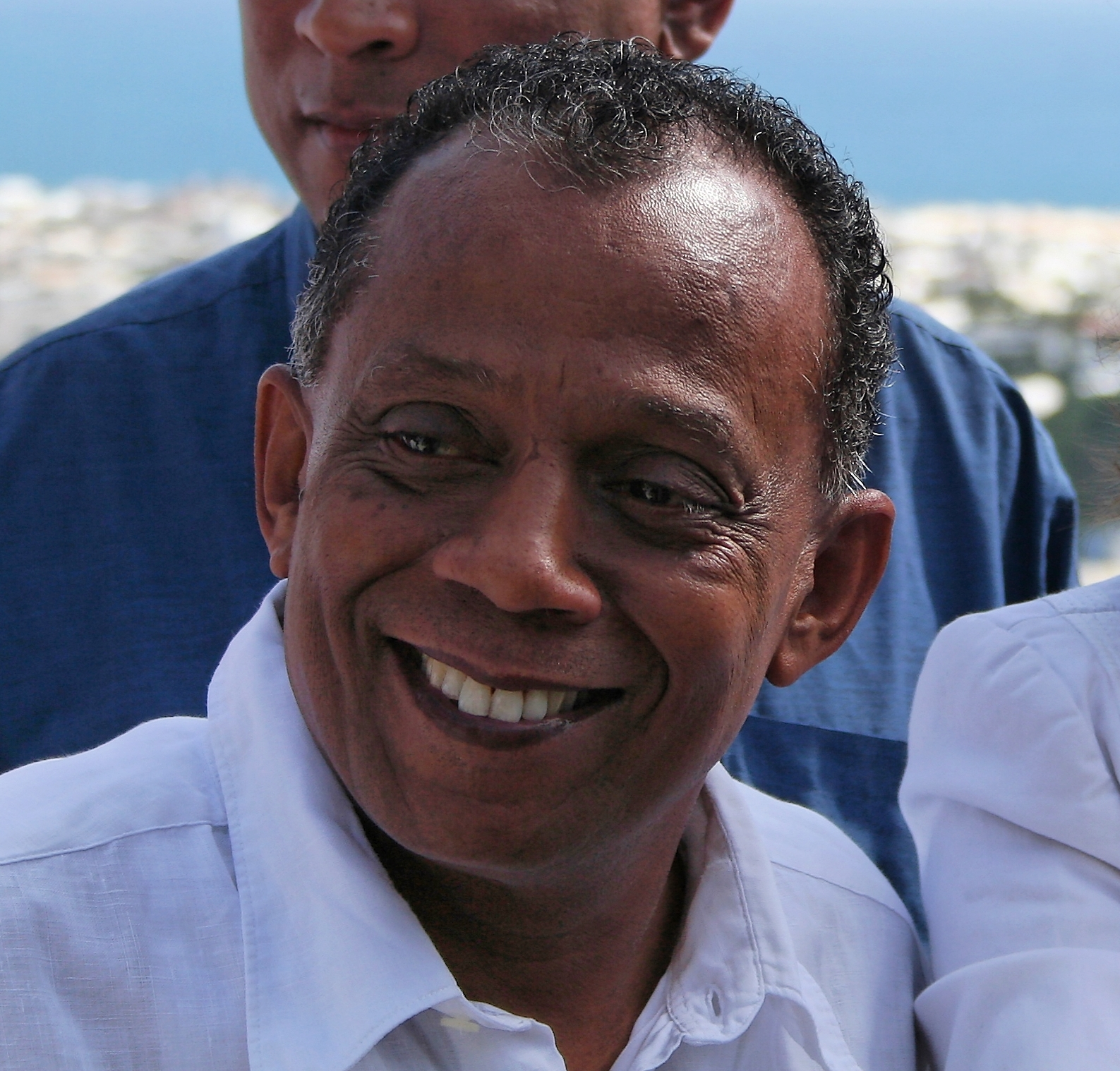
- A picture of Gilbert Annette

Mayor of Saint-Denis, Réunion
- In office 16 March 2008 – 4 July 2020
- Preceded by: René-Paul Victoria
- Succeeded by: Ericka Bareigts

Member of the National Assembly for Réunion's 1st constituency
- In office 2 April 1993 – 21 April 1997
- Preceded by: Auguste Legros
- Succeeded by: Michel Tamaya

Personal details
- Born: 10 March 1946 (age 80) Antsiranana, Madagascar
- Party: Socialist Party
- Education: IAE de La Réunion

Gilbert Annette (French pronunciation: [ʒilbɛʁ anɛt]; born 10 March 1946) is a Malagasy politician. He represented Réunion in the French National Assembly from 1993-1997 and has been the Mayor of Saint-Denis, Réunion between 2008 and 2020.

== Career ==
Annette is a member of the Socialist Party. He became a member of the Départemental Council in 1983 and a member of the Regional Council in 1988. He was the Mayor of Saint-Denis, Réunion from 1989–1994 and was reelected in 2008.

He was a Deputy from 1993-1997 and was convicted for corruption in 1996. He was sentenced to 5 years of deprivation of his civil rights, a 200.000 FRF (30.000 €) fine and 30 months in prison. Since 2004 he has been the 1st secretary of the socialist federation of Reunion. He was re-elected mayor of Saint-Denis, Réunion in 2008 with 53,83% of the votes.
