= Ericka Bareigts =

French politician

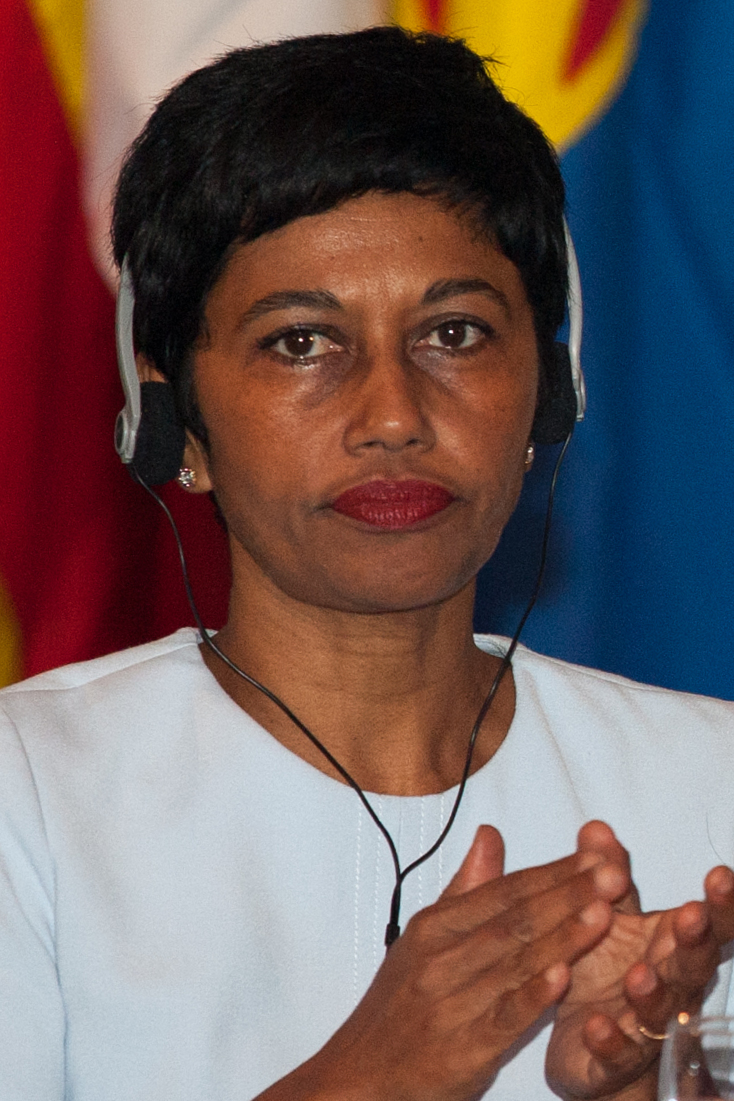
- Ericka Bareigts in 2016

Mayor of Saint-Denis, Réunion
- Incumbent
- Assumed office 4 July 2020
- Preceded by: Gilbert Annette

Member of the National Assembly for Réunion's 1st constituency
- In office 18 June 2017 – 13 July 2020
- Preceded by: Philippe Naillet
- Succeeded by: Philippe Naillet
- In office 17 June 2012 – 12 March 2016
- Preceded by: René-Paul Victoria
- Succeeded by: Philippe Naillet

Minister of Overseas France
- In office 30 August 2016 – 10 May 2017
- President: François Hollande
- Prime Minister: Manuel Valls; Bernard Cazeneuve
- Preceded by: George Pau-Langevin
- Succeeded by: Annick Girardin

Personal details
- Born: 16 April 1967 (age 59) Saint-Denis, Réunion
- Party: Socialist Party
- Education: University of La Réunion; Paris 1 Panthéon-Sorbonne University

Ericka Bareigts (French pronunciation: [eʁika baʁɛtʃ]; born 16 April 1967) is a French politician of the Socialist Party (PS) who served as Minister of Overseas France in the governments of successive Prime Minister Manuel Valls and Bernard Cazeneuve from 30 August 2016 to 10 May 2017. She was a member of the National Assembly from 2012 until 2016 and from 2017 until 2020. Since 4 July 2020 she has been serving as Mayor of Saint-Denis, Réunion.

== Early life and education ==
Bareigts was born on 16 April 1967 in Saint-Denis, Réunion. She graduated from the University of La Réunion, where she received a bachelor of laws, followed by the Pantheon-Sorbonne University, where she received a master of law.

Bareigts worked as a civil servant.

== Political career ==
=== Career in local politics ===
Bareights joined the Socialist Party at the age of thirty. She was elected as second vice mayor of her hometown, Saint-Denis, in 2008. She initiated many projects for the city, in particular the global educational project (PEG) which promotes the teaching of English in large section of kindergarten, the learning of chess games during the lunch break or the work of sports educators with young students on "self-esteem".

The same year, Bareigts was elected president of the intercommunal community of Northern Reunion (CINOR), becoming the first woman to manage an intercommunal of Reunion. CINOR brings together the municipalities of Saint-Denis, Sainte-Marie and Sainte-Suzanne, representing more than 190,000 inhabitants, constituting the largest urban community in Réunion and Overseas.

Bareigts was chosen as head of the PS's list for the 2009 European elections in the Overseas Territories of France. This list obtained 20.3% of the votes behind the UMP's list of Marie-Luce Penchard (29.7%) and the Alliance of the Overseas's list of Élie Hoarau (21%).

Bareigts won a seat as a regional councilor in the 2010 regional elections in Reunion, the list on which she appeared obtaining 18% of the votes cast.

=== Member of the National Assembly ===
==== 1st term ====
In 2012, Bareigts ran for legislative elections in Réunion's 1st constituency. In the second round, she was elected member of the National Assembly with 52.8% of the votes cast.

In February 2014, Bareigts presented a resolution relating to Reunionese children placed in metropolitan France in the years 1960-1970, which was voted in the National Assembly. This resolution recognizes the moral responsibility of the French State. From 1963 to 1982, at least 2,150 children from Réunion, "abandoned or not" and forcibly registered by the French authorities with the Departmental Directorate of Health and Social Affairs, were deported by the authorities in order to repopulate the metropolitan departments victims of the rural flight.

In 2015, Bareigts proposed a bill to replace traditional Roman Catholic holidays like Christmas and Easter with local holidays in La Reunion The bill was rejected.

In September 2015, Bareigts was applauded in the National Assembly for her response to the words of Nadine Morano who had described France as a “white race country”. She declares thus: "For me, black deputy of the Republic, France described by Mrs. Morano is not mine".

In the Socialist Party's 2017 presidential primaries Bareigts endorsed Manuel Valls as the party's candidate for that year's presidential election and worked on his campaign team. When Benoît Hamon emerged as the primaries' winner, she joined his campaign team.

==== 2nd term ====
Bareigts was re-elected on 18 June 2017 as deputy for the Réunion's 1st constituency, with almost 66% of the vote in the second round.

On 12 September 2018, following the appointment of François de Rugy to the government, Bareigts was the Socialist group's candidate for the President of the National Assembly and collected 31 votes.

On 3 March 2018, during a visit to the Cimendef media library in Saint-Paul, recently bought by the Réunion region, Bareigts and Huguette Bello were refused access to part of the building. The elected officials then forced the passage to be able to enter, accompanied by the Cimendef collective. Denouncing the assault on a guard by the two deputies, the Regional Council of Réunion filed a complaint for breach of domicile. The Reunionese media then talk about the Cimendef case.

On 1 June 2018 Bareigts succeeds in bringing the government back to public session, which wanted to derogate Overseas and Corsica from the application of the 1986 coastal law (law on the development, protection and enhancement of the coastline), by allowing the construction of public or private collective facilities nearby ocean or beaches.

=== Secretary of Real Equality ===
Bareigts served as Secretary of Real Equality under Prime Minister Manuel Valls from February 2016 to 20 March 2016. She was in charge of economic equality between Metropolitan France and the French Overseas regions. Shortly after her appointment, Le Monde published an article suggesting her official title was unclear.

=== Minister of Overseas Territories ===
Bareigts was appointed Minister of Overseas France on 30 August 2016 and replaced in the National Assembly by her substitute, Phillipe Naillet. The fourth Minister since 1958 to come from an overseas department and the first Reunion Islander to accede to the post of Minister, aware of her lack of notoriety, she spoke to Libération, who dedicated a portrait to her: "No one knows me enough at the national level, but I am a field politician, engaged for thirty years on the island of Reunion". When she was appointed, she declared that she wanted to implement the real equality of these territories with the metropolis and promote "territorialized growth" and went for her first trip to Mayotte, the poorest department in France. She will go there again while the department is experiencing an unprecedented drought since the meteorological records of 1941.

On 28 March 2017, during the 2017 social unrest in French Guiana, Bareigts and fellow minister Matthias Fekl were sent to the overseas department by Prime Minister Cazeneuve, pledging a €1 billion investment in infrastructure.

=== Return to local politics ===
in the 2020 municipal elections, Bareigts was head of the union of the left in Saint-Denis, Réunion. Her list topped the first round with 42.7% of the vote, ahead of the right list led by the president of the Regional Council of Réunion Didier Robert (24.9%) and the center list of Senator of France Nassimah Dindar (13%), and she became mayor of Saint-Denis.
