= Familistère of Reims =

Familistère des Docks Rémois
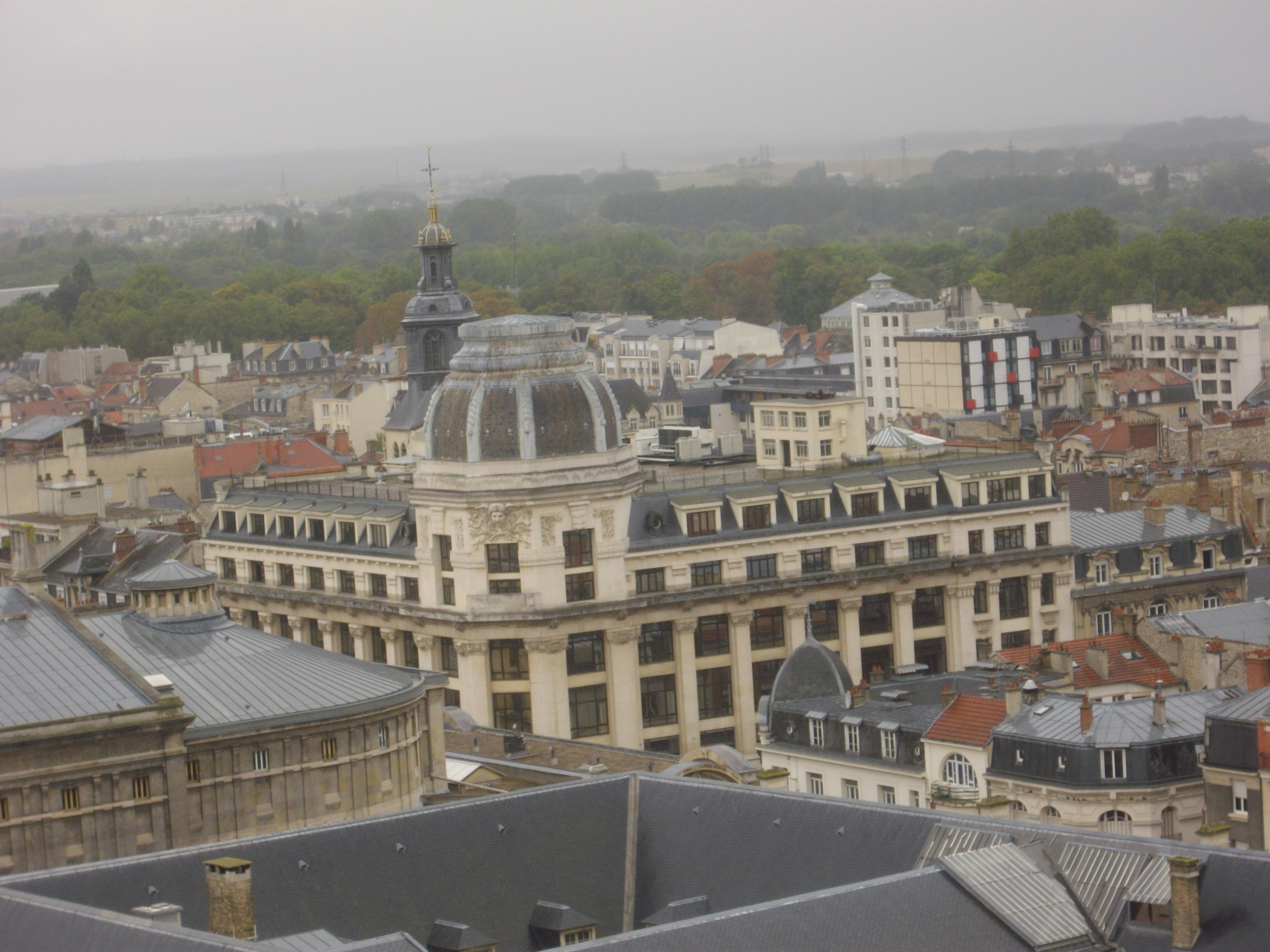
- Façade on Rue de Vesle and Rue de Talleyrand

- Location within France

General information
- Type: Department Store
- Architectural style: Art Deco
- Location: Reims, France
- Coordinates: 49.254208°N 4.029978°E
- Construction started: 1925
- Completed: 1927

Design and construction
- Architect: Pol Gosset

The Familistère des Docks Rémois is an Art deco building located in Reims, France. Constructed between 1925 and 1927, it originally served as the headquarters, store, and permanent exhibition space for the Docks Rémois department stores. In 1928, the building was occupied by the Reims Management School and later became the headquarters for the newspaper L'Union. Today, it houses shops and offices, including a Monoprix store that relocated there in 1978.

== Architecture and fittings ==
The building project, overseen by Jean Walter's Société de Construction et d'Installation Industrielle, was part of a reconstruction effort after World War I. Pol Gosset, the architect for Docks Rémois, designed the building with masonry and stonework by Blondet, and reinforced concrete by Coignet. Sculptures were created by Chatillon, and the ironwork was done by Raymond Subes. A plaque on the Rue de Vesle facade commemorates Napoleon's stay in 1814.

== Gallery ==
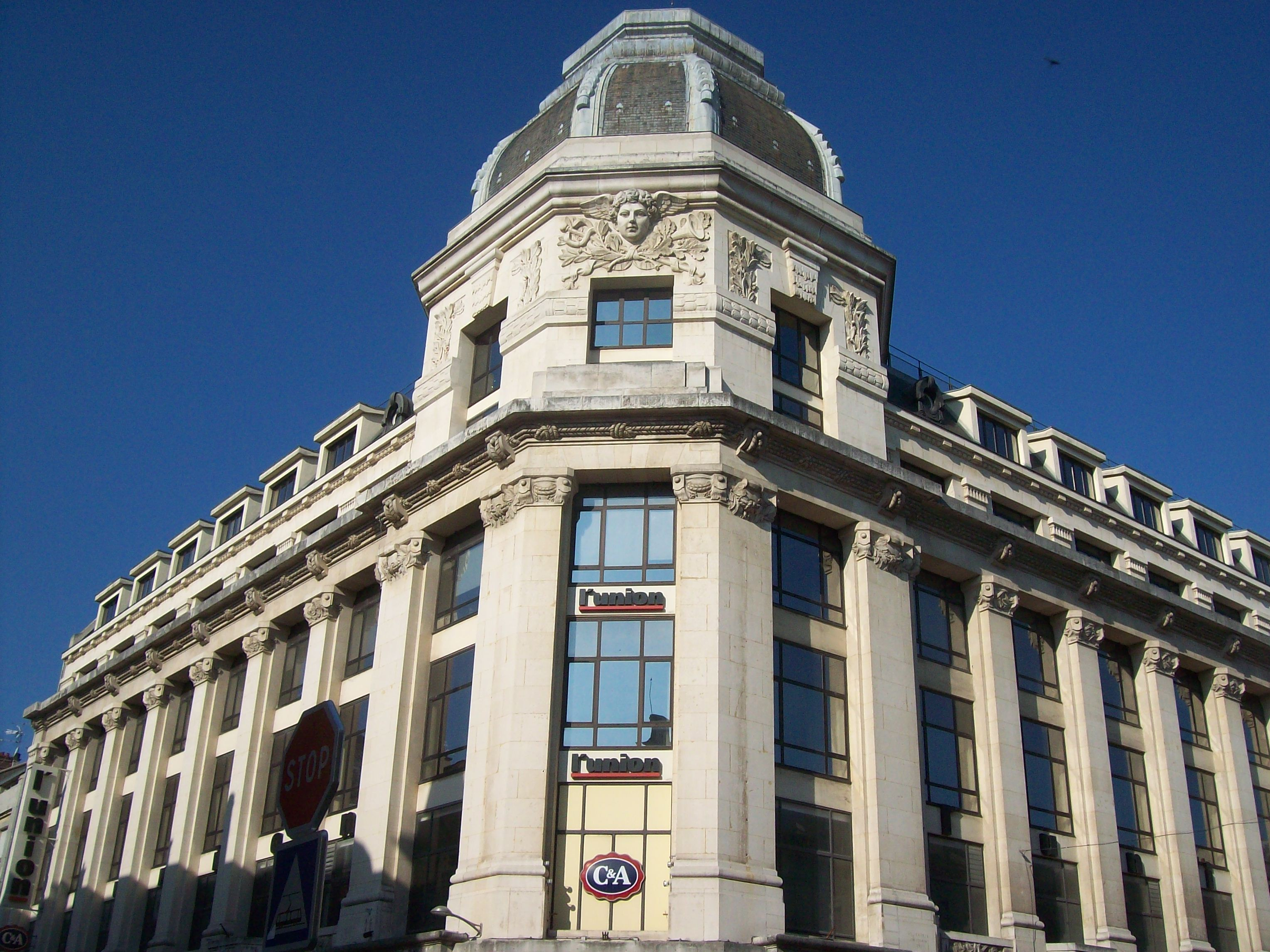
Angle of Rue de Vesle and Rue de Talleyrand

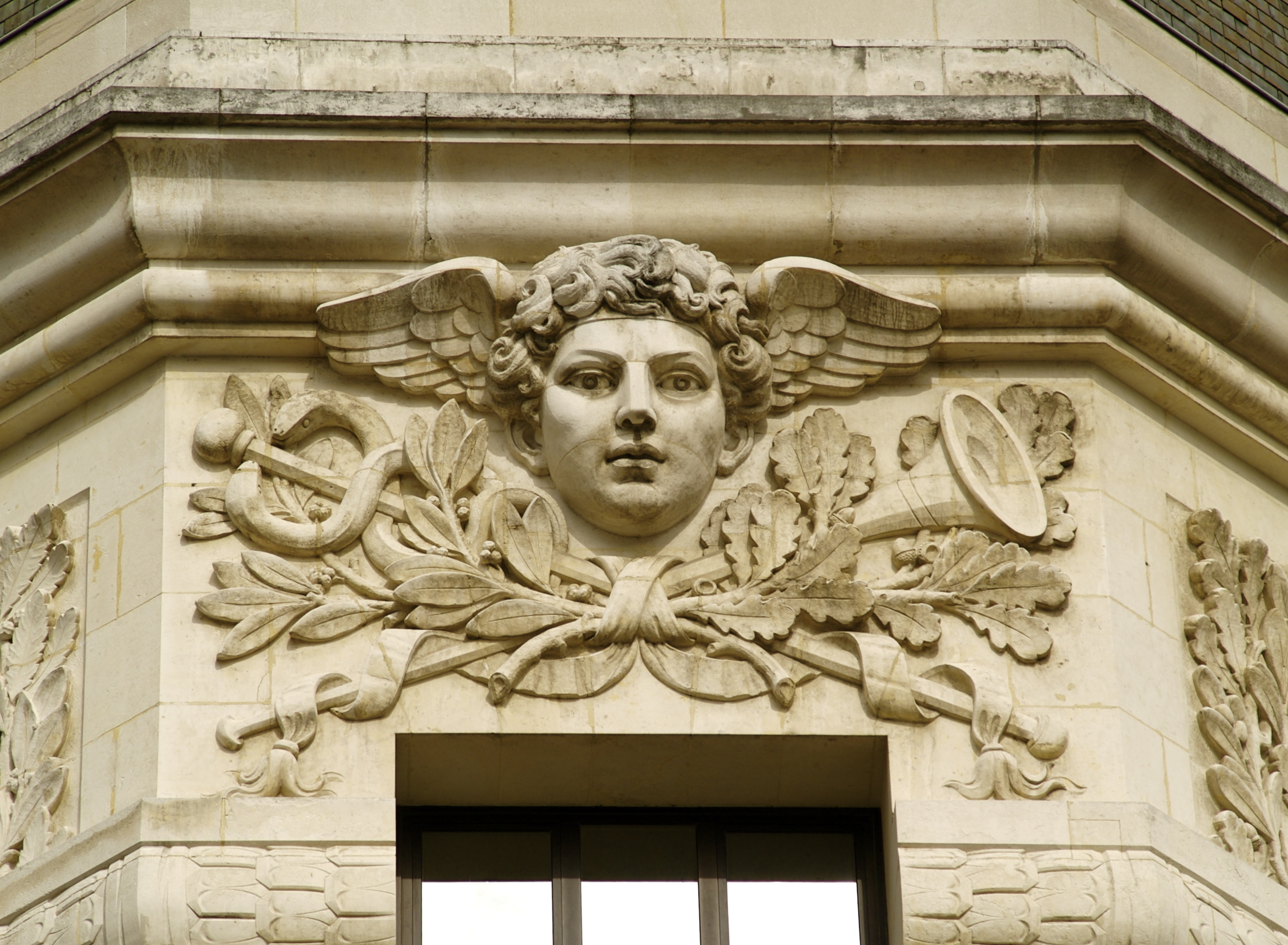
Mercury sculpture

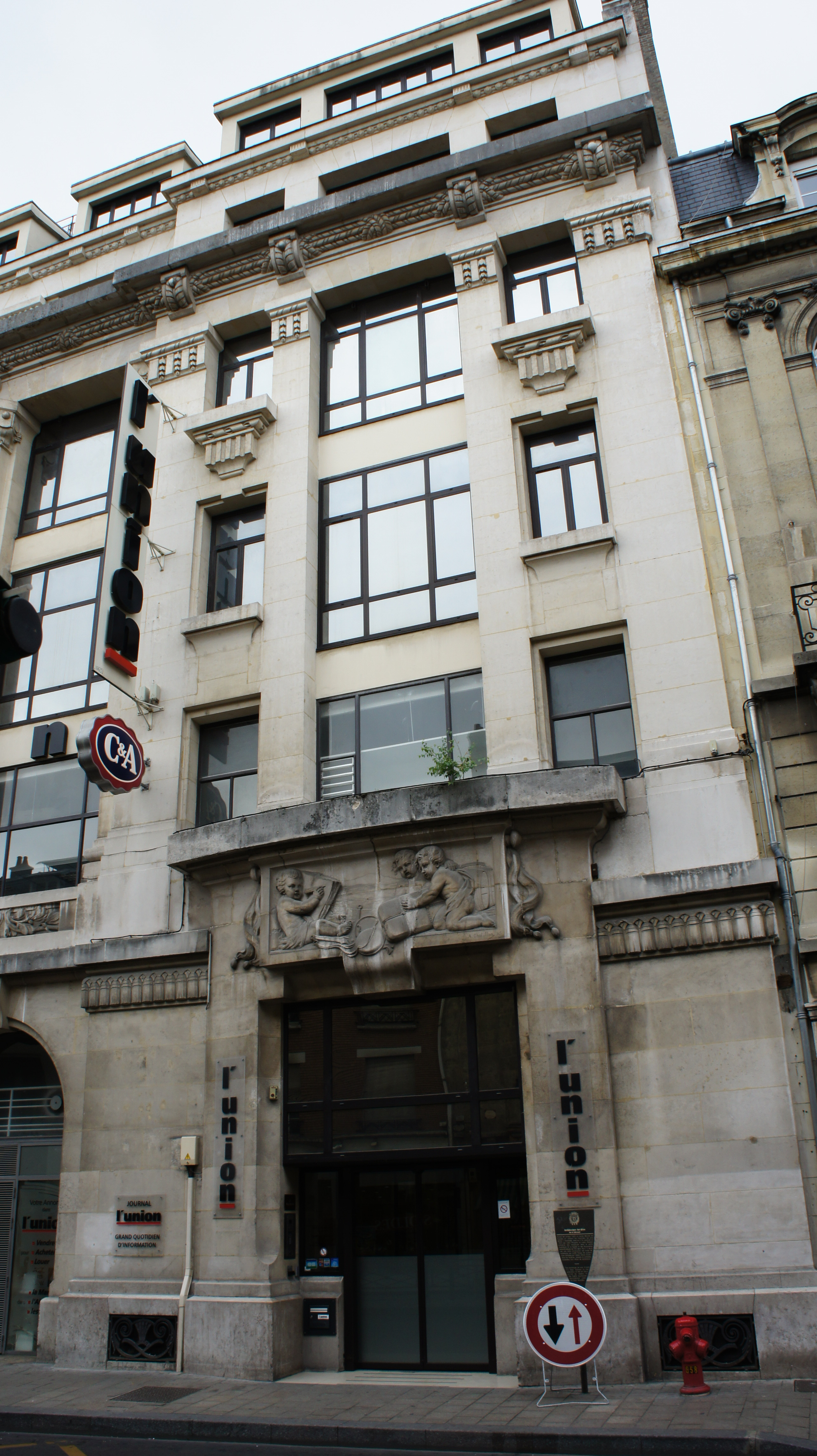
Entrance on Rue Talleyrand

== Bibliography ==
- Reims Reconstruction 1920-1930, by Olivier Rigaud and Marc Dedarida, 1988, published by the City of Reims.
- Reims à l'époque de l'Art déco, by Olivier Rigaud, Guide (book and CD-ROM), 2006, published by the CRDP Champagne-Ardennes.
