= Jacques Tillier =

French journalist

Jacques Tillier is a French journalist and the managing editor of L'Union, L'Est-Éclair, Libération Champagne and L'Aisne Nouvelle. He was seriously injured in 1979 by Jacques Mesrine while working for the Minute. He was also director of the Journal de l'île de La Réunion before becoming the CEO of L'Union.

== Biography ==
After several years as a policeman in the Directorate of Territorial Security (DST), Tillier pursued a career as a journalist, first writing for Minute, a right-wing weekly journal. Using his past police connections and his friendship with Commissioner Lucien Aimé-Blanc, head of the Central Office For Combating Banditry (OCRB), he began to write articles that contradicted the "honourable gangster" image conveyed by Jacques Mesrine, who in France was public enemy number one. In spite of Mesrine's threats, Tillier continued to publish articles refuting the criminal's image as a modern-day Robin Hood.

Tillier gained an exclusive interview with Mesrine on 10 September 1979, but Mesrine and his accomplice, Charlie Bauer, drove Tillier to a candlelit cave in the Forest of Halatte, where they forced him to strip naked before handcuffing him. Mesrine beat, tortured and humiliated Tillier, claiming that he was a fascist and police informant. He then shot Tillier three times with a revolver, first in the face, "to stop him talking crap", then in the arm "to stop him writing crap" and finally in the leg "for the pleasure of it". He took pictures as Tillier lay naked and bloodied, and left him for dead.

Tillier survived the ordeal, although he lost the use of one arm. After two weeks in hospital he returned to Minute, but eventually decided to leave the weekly. He became advisor to Paul Biya, President of the Republic of Cameroon, and Lansana Conte in Guinea. Tillier then returned to journalism and worked on the Journal de l'île de La Réunion (JIR), where in the early 1990s he was appointed editor. JIR was bought by France-Antilles, a subsidiary of the Groupe Hersant Média. Tillier subsequently became its director and CEO.

In his editorial published on 9 February 2008, entitled "On s'en tamponne mister Président", he announced his departure from the JIR. He became the CEO of the daily L'Union in 2008.

== See also ==
- Lists of solved missing person cases
