= Ramsamy =

Ramsamy is a Mauritian surname. Notable people with the name include:

- Jean-Régis Ramsamy (born 1966), French television journalist
- Prega Ramsamy (born 1950), Mauritian politician
- Sam Ramsamy (born 1938), South African activist and sports administrator
