= Nassimah Dindar =

French politician

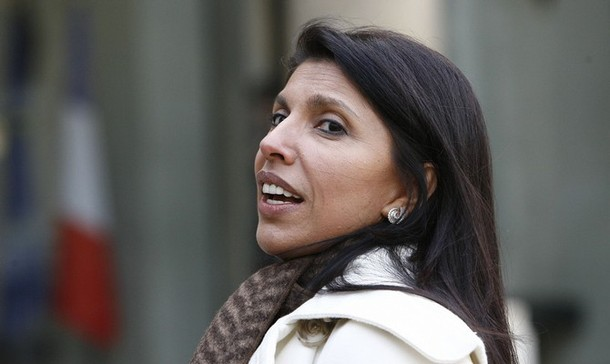
- Nassimah Dindar in 2008

Senator of France for Réunion
- Incumbent
- Assumed office 2 October 2017 Serving with: Jean-Louis Lagourge; Viviane Malet; Michel Dennemont
- Preceded by: Michel Fontaine
- Parliamentary group: Centrist Union
- Constituency: La Réunion

Departmental Councilor for La Reunion
- Incumbent
- Assumed office 2 April 2015 Serving with Serge Hoarau
- Preceded by: Gérard Françoise

President of the Departmental Council of La Reunion
- In office 1 April 2004 – 18 December 2017
- Preceded by: Jean-Luc Poudroux
- Succeeded by: Cyrille Melchior

General Councilor for La Reunion
- In office 18 March 2001 – 2 April 2015
- Preceded by: Jean Chatel
- Succeeded by: Alain Armand; Nadia Ramassamy

Personal details
- Born: Nassimah Mangrolia; 20 January 1960 (age 66) Saint-Louis, Réunion
- Citizenship: French
- Party: Union of Democrats and Independents
- Other political affiliations: Rally for the Republic, Union for a Popular Movement
- Spouse: Ibrahim Dindar
- Education: University of Provence
- Occupation: Teacher

Nassimah Dindar, née Mangrolia (born 20 January 1960 in Saint-Louis, Réunion), is a French politician, serving as one of four Senators for the French Overseas department and region of Réunion. Dindar was originally elected in the 2017 French legislative election.

Prior to her election, Dindar served as the first female elected president of the General Council of La Reunion, a position she held from 2004 to 2017. At the same time, she was leader of Droite sociale, a local political party, before joining the Union of Democrats and Independents.

== Biography ==
Nassimah Mangrolia was born to a large family, the sixth of twelve. Her father, a professor of the Quran, raised them in a strict religious household as members of Reunion's Zarabe community.

After receiving her baccalauréat littéraire, she traveled to Mainland France to study at the université de Provence Aix-Marseille I, where she received a master's degree. Upon receiving a teaching certificate, she returned to Reunion, where she taught French and History at a Lycee in Saint-Denis.

In the late 1980s, Nassimah became active on issues of women's rights. She volunteered with the group Femmes actuelles de La Reunion, which she became president of in 1996.

=== Political career ===
Dindar was first elected to the Regional Council of La Reunion in 1998, on the party list of Margie Sudre. She became an assistant secretary within Rally for the Republic and, from 2002, third deputy mayor for Saint-Denis and the vice-president of the departmental council of Reunion, as the elected representative of Saint-Denis canton.

As head of the Departmental Council for Reunion from 2004 to 2017, she was the first woman elected president of the council. Additionally, she was the first Muslim woman to be elected to a departmental council anywhere in France.

Dindar was appointed as the Delegate General for diversity within the national office of the Union for a Popular Movement, where she engaged in outreach on behalf of the party in the Overseas department and regions. In 2005, she was named as Secretary of State for Integration in the government of Dominique de Villepin. She was awarded the Ordre national du Mérite in 2006.

During the 2007 French presidential election, Dindar, together with Valérie Pécresse and Bérengère Poletti issued a statement critical of Socialist Party candidate Ségolène Royal, noting her absence at meetings on preventing violence against women. Speaking to press in Reunion, she said "Violence does not have political colors" and said that meetings like these give hope to victims.

Dindar stood as a candidate in the 2007 French legislative elections for Réunion's 1st constituency as a member of the "Presidential Majority" coalition. She faced the UMP candidate, deputy-mayor René-Paul Victoria. Eliminated in the first round with 5,381 votes, she endorsed whichever UMP candidate was able to win a mandate.

Despite this loss, Dindar was named a political advisor on diversity issues for President Nicolas Sarkozy.

In February 2008, she was named by Jean-Louis Borloo, Minister of Ecology as one of the Overseas France representatives to the Grenelle de l'environnement.

During the 2008 French cantonal elections, Dindar ran again as a candidate of the UMP, but was placed on the last place on the party list of the outgoing mayor. After coalition negotiations, right-wing representatives of the Departmental Council (led by Rene-Paul Victoria) named Jean-Louis Lagourgue as their choice for head of the council. However, a quorum was unable to be organized in time to vote for Lagourgue as the only candidate, necessitating a candidate who could command majority support among council members. Dindar was able to use the support of the UMP, MoDem, Communist Party of Réunion and the Socialist Party to be re-elected as head of the Departmental Council.

Re-elected in 2011 with two-thirds of the votes in her district, Dindar announced plans to run in the 2012 French legislative election for Réunion's 1st constituency in the National Assembly. She rejoined the Democratic Movement and supported their leader François Bayrou in the presidential election. Calling her candidacy "Centre for France", she beat her former opponent René-Paul Victoria by 264 votes to make it to the second round of voting. In the second round, she faced Socialist Party candidate, Ericka Bareigts, in the constituency's first election between two female candidates. Bareigts beat Dindar in the second round, 19,611 to 15,937.

In the 2015 local elections, she was re-elected in the first round for Canton Saint-Denis.. Elle conserve la tête du conseil départemental malgré le changement de majorité.

She was elected as a Senator representing Reunion in the 2017 French Senate election..

Despite the law regarding dual mandates requiring officials to resign from departmental functions to accept a national position, Dindar filed an appeal with the Constitutional Council to try and extend her mandate as President of the Departmental Council. This appeal was rejected on 1 December 2017, and she resigned her position on 18 December.

== Controversies ==
=== Terre Rouge ===
In June 2016, Dindar was sentenced to three years probation, a six months suspended sentence in prison and a fine of 30,000 Euro for a hiring discrimination case. She was released on appeal in March 2017. The case is still being tried in appeals.

=== Parisian Regional Office ===
On 6 December 2018, Nassimah Dindar was called to the local magistrate for a hearing on the management of the Paris office of the Regional Council of Réunion, which was criticized by the Regional Chamber of Accounts, an auditor of Regional finances.

An investigation by Le Quotidien de La Reunion said the office was suspected of financial mismanagement, tax evasion, erratic management, and "hiring out of any regulatory framework".

The judicial proceedings found that the regional office "seemed particularly questionable", according to the findings of the CRC.

In 2012, the council invested over six-million Euro in a six-floor, 700m² building in the Marais. The fourth floor of the building included a private apartment used by Dindar and her associates, allegedly to avoid accommodation costs.

=== Glaive ===
In 2017, the CRC criticized the functioning of Glaive, an organization headed by Dindar and subsidized by the regional government.

A report by the Journal de l'île de La Réunion affirmed that "Since its creation, the Glaive resembles a political machine meant to benefit the Premier and the Head of the General Council, Nassimah Dindar", mainly because the organization is based in Dindar's canton and has a hiring process that lacks transparency.

=== SDIS ===
In its reports of the Departmental Fire and Rescue Service, the Regional Chamber of Accounts denounced mismanagement within the local fire and rescue service on Réunion. The Chamber referred a case to the chief prosecutor Eric Trufféry, who opened a preliminary investigation in June 2018 around Embezzlement of public funds and undue influence issues.

The prosecutors investigation charged Nassimah Dindar for having hired employees out of compliance with labour law. She hired two members of the local fire and rescue service to work "in a private manner" as an assistant and a gardiner.

On 27 December 2018, Nassimah Dindar served as a witness for a hearing at Caserne Vérines on this issue.

=== Bas-Rivière Villa Affair ===
In October 2017, an investigative report by the Journal de l'île de La Réunion found that questionable conditions around the sale and renovations of Dindar's house. Both the public prosecutor and the National Financial Prosecutor's office opened investigations following the report.

On 25 April, Dindar's home at 21 Rue de la Digue in the Bas de la Rivière neighborhood in Saint-Denis was raided for three hours by investigators from the National Financial Prosecutor's office as part of their preliminary investigation. Their investigation found that Dindar had purchased her Case Creole house for about 130,000 Euro, far below its actual cost. Additionally, the PNF looked into construction and renovation work done at the house, and suspected that some contractors may have been paid by the Departmental Government or received government contracts or government jobs for friends and relatives.
