= Réunion's 1st constituency =

Constituency of the French Fifth Republic

1st constituency of Réunion
- inline Constituency of the National Assembly of France

- The constituency in Réunion
- Deputy: Philippe Naillet; PS
- Department: Réunion
- Cantons: Saint-Denis-1, Saint-Denis-2, Saint-Denis-3, Saint-Denis-4, Saint-Denis-5, Saint-Denis-6, Saint-Denis-8
- Registered voters: 88,571

The 1st constituency of Réunion is a French legislative constituency on the island of Réunion. As of 2024, it is represented by Philippe Naillet and Socialist Party deputy.

== Deputies ==
Election	Member	Party
1958	Michel Debré	UNR
1962	Michel Debré	UNR
1967	Michel Debré	UDR
1968	Michel Debré	UDR
1973	Michel Debré	UDR
1978	Michel Debré	RPR
1981	Michel Debré	RPR
1986	Proportional representation, no election by constituency	
1988	Auguste Legros	RPR
1993	Gilbert Annette	PS
1997	Michel Tamaya	PS
2002	René-Paul Victoria	UMP
2007	René-Paul Victoria	UMP
2012	Ericka Bareigts	PS
2016	Philippe Naillet	PS
2017	Ericka Bareigts	PS
2020	Philippe Naillet	PS
2022	Philippe Naillet	PS
2024	Philippe Naillet	PS

== Election results ==
=== 2024 ===
Candidate	Party	Alliance	First round		Second round	
Candidate	Party	Alliance	Votes	%	Votes	%
Philippe Naillet	PS	NFP	19,186	46.25	27,276	64.72
Jean Jacques Morel	RN		11,451	27.60	14,868	35.28
René-Paul Victoria	LR	UDC	5,670	13.67		
Ludovic Sautron*	GÉ. diss		2,126	5.13		
Gaëlle Lebon	REC		1,693	4.08		
Gino Ponin Ballom	DVD		699	1.69		
Paul Techer	LO		450	1.08		
Nadine Mitra	DIV		148	0.36		
Krisna Sawoo	DIV		59	0.14		
Valid votes			41,482	100.00	42,144	100.00
Blank votes			1,134	2.61	1,858	4.12
Null votes			809	1.86	1,087	2.41
Turnout			43,425	49.04	45,089	50.91
Abstentions			45,122	50.96	43,482	49.09
Registered voters			88,547		88,571	
Result			PS HOLD			

*Ludovic Sautron ran as a dissident candidate for Ecology Generation, without the support of the New Popular Front, and was excluded from the party as a result.

=== 2022 ===
Legislative Election 2022: Réunion's 1st constituency
Party	Candidate	Votes	%	±%
PS (NUPÉS)	Philippe Naillet	7,742	33.47	-25.34
DVD	Jean-Jacques Morel	3,378	14.61	N/A
RN	Gaëlle Lebon	3,015	13.04	+8.39
GE	Ludovic Sautron	1,371	5.93	N/A
DVC (Ensemble)	Farid Mangrolia	1,353	5.85	+2.45
DVC	Eric Magamootoo	1,217	5.27	N/A
DVG	Giovanni Payet	970	4.19	N/A
LR (UDC)	Murielle Sisteron	909	3.93	−17.75
DVC	Jean Alexandre Poleya	524	2.27	+1.15
DVC	Hary Grondin	469	2.03	N/A
DVE	Yvette Duchemann	468	2.02	N/A
Others	N/A	1,713	5.63	
Turnout		23,129	29.05	−7.04
2nd round result
PS (NUPÉS)	Philippe Naillet	14,876	60.78	-5.08
DVD	Jean-Jacques Morel	9,640	39.32	N/A
Turnout		24,516	31.77	−7.73
PS hold				

=== 2017 ===
Candidate	Label	First round		Second round	
Candidate	Label	Votes	%	Votes	%
Ericka Bareigts	PS	12,849	47.23	18,950	65.86
Jean-Jacques Morel	LR	5,899	21.68	9,824	34.14
Julie Pontalba	FI	2,193	8.06		
Jean-Pierre Celeste	FN	1,265	4.65		
Jean-Pierre Marchau	ECO	958	3.52		
Karine Nabenesa	MoDem	925	3.40		
Frédéric Foucque	DVD	824	3.03		
Farid Mangrolia	DIV	731	2.69		
Jean-Alexandre Poleya	DVD	305	1.12		
Jean-Paul Panechou	DVG	213	0.78		
Dominique Frut	DIV	208	0.76		
Isma Belkessam	DIV	195	0.72		
Jean-Roland Ango	DIV	185	0.68		
Hugues Maillot	DVD	146	0.54		
Jürgen Leon	DVG	137	0.50		
Corinne Gasp	EXG	127	0.47		
Ariane Dedieu	DIV	48	0.18		
Votes		27,208	100.00	28,774	100.00
Valid votes		27,208	93.63	28,774	90.49
Blank votes		1,061	3.65	1,517	4.77
Null votes		789	2.72	1,508	4.74
Turnout		29,058	36.09	31,799	39.50
Abstentions		51,449	63.91	48,707	60.50
Registered voters		80,507		80,506	

=== 2012 ===
Legislative Election 2012: Réunion 1st - 2nd round
Party	Candidate	Votes	%	±%
PS	Ericka Bareigts	19,610	55.17	
MoDem	Nassimah Dindar	15,936	44.83	
Turnout		38,333	51.80	
PS hold		Swing		
