= Ibrahim Dindar =

French politician

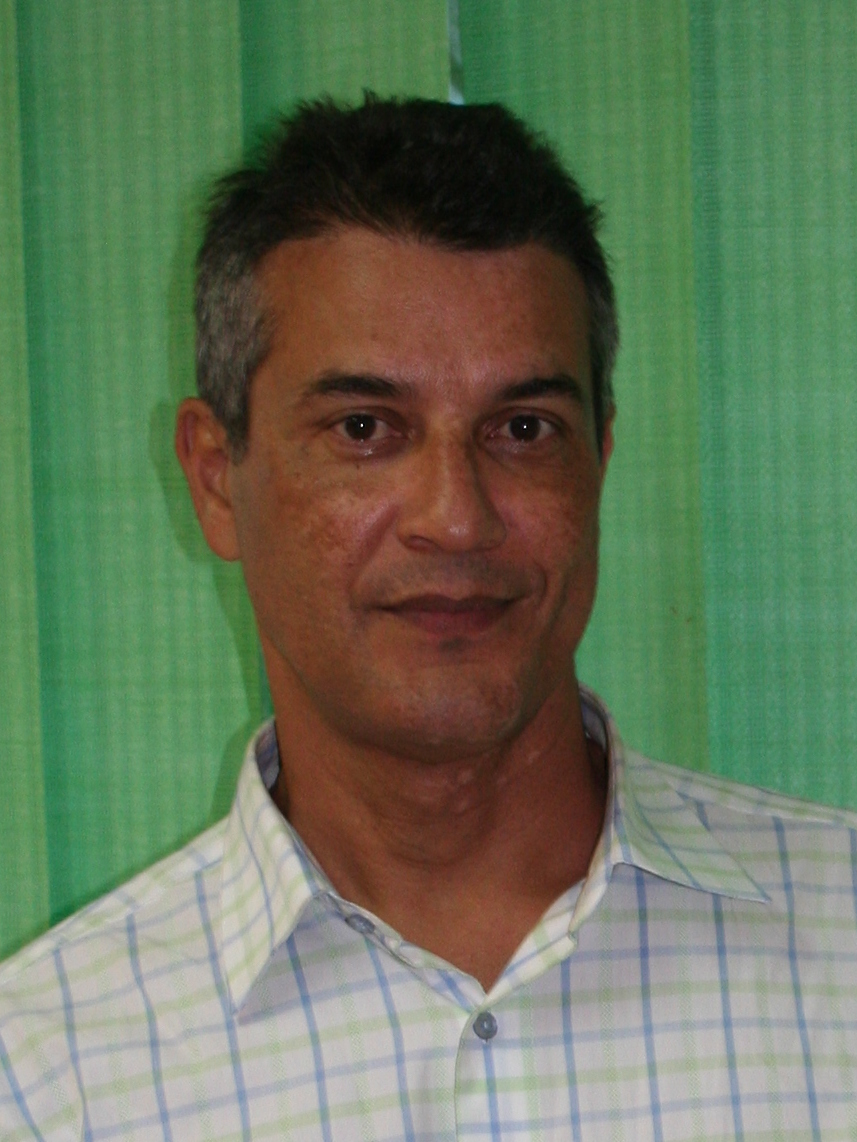
Ibrahim Dindar

Ibrahim David Dindar is a French politician from the island of Réunion. A Muslim, he is married to Nassimah Dindar, the president of the island's general council, and serves as its vice-president. He previously served as a councillor for the city of Saint-Denis, in which capacity he also served as a regional councillor on the island's governing body.

Currently Dindar is the head of the Réunionese Union for French Democracy, and also affiliates himself with the Union for a Popular Movement. He first ran for the post in 2005, winning when René-Paul Victoria dropped his candidacy at the last minute. Dindar supported Nicolas Sarkozy in his campaign to become president of France. At the end of September, 2005, he suggested using genetic fingerprinting as a means of limiting immigration to Réunion from Comoros; this resulted in a great deal of outrage from the public.
