= University of Reunion Island =

French university in the French overseas department of La Reunion

- Université de La Réunion
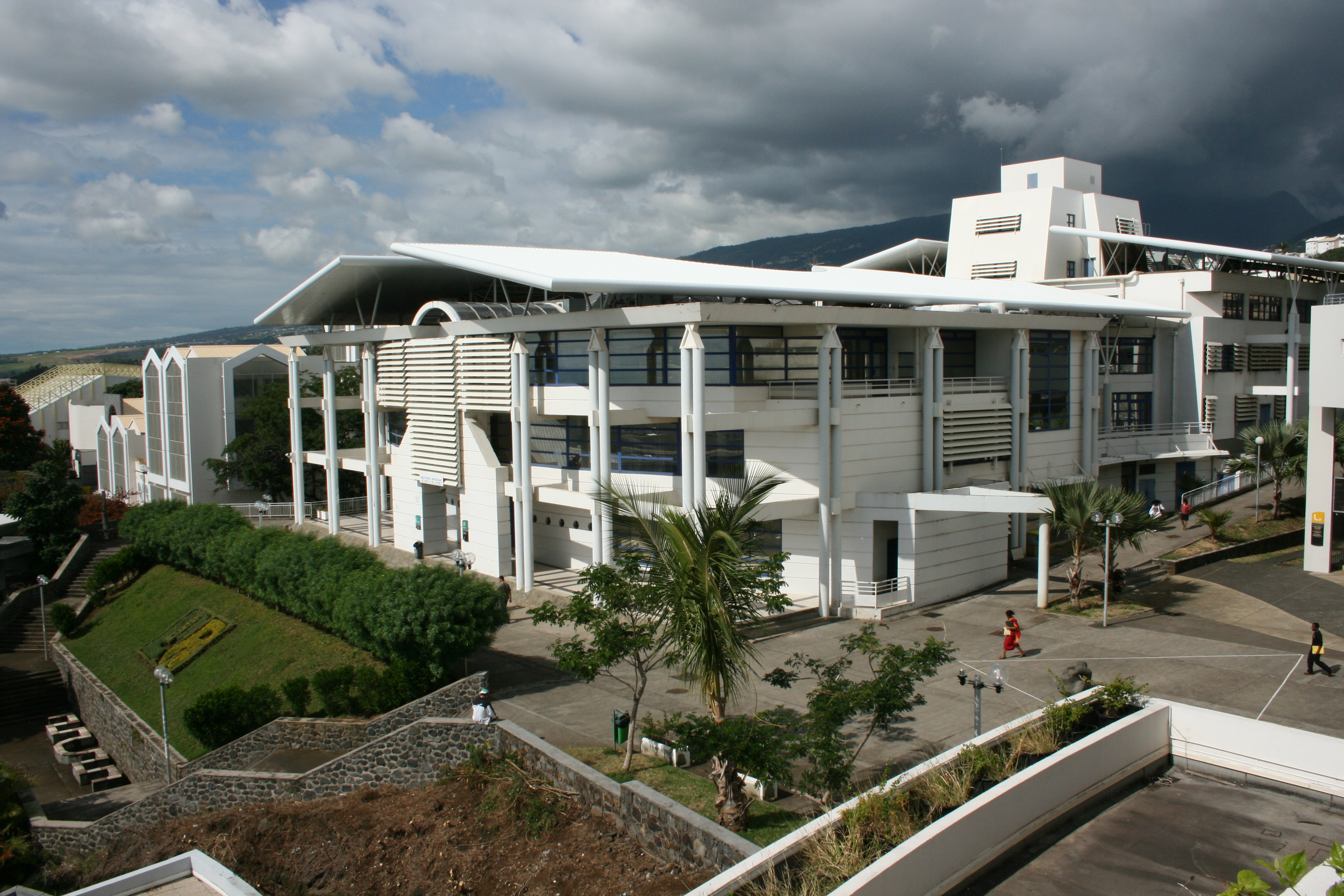
- Motto: The European university of the Indian Ocean
- Type: Public
- Established: 1982
- President: Mohamed Rochdi
- Students: 12000
- Location: 15, avenue René Cassin, CS 92003, 97744 Saint Denis Cedex 9, Saint-Denis, Réunion, France; 20°54′6″S 55°29′2″E
- Website: (in English)

The University of Reunion Island (Université de La Réunion) is a French university in the Academy of Réunion. It is the first and only European university in the Indian Ocean. Established in 1982, it has grown steadily over the years in terms of student population, geographical sites occupied, courses offered and partnerships forged with local, national, and international institutions. The school's ambition is to be the reference university in Indianoceania.

The University has 123 ERASMUS+ inter-institutional agreements. Its European project EVAL-IC (Evaluation of Competences in Intercomprehension) has been awarded the "good practice" label by the Erasmus+ France Agency, given to projects that present "high quality implementation and results".

== History ==
In 1982: the faculty of "Law and Economics" was the first faculty at the University of Reunion, followed by the faculty "Sciences and Technologies" and the faculty "Letters and Humanities".

In 2005 : creation of the fourth faculty "Human and Environmental Sciences".

In 2010 : creation of the "Health" faculty

== Key figures ==
- 594 administrative staff
- 18,910 students for the 2020/2021 year
- Over 5% foreign students for the year 2020/2021
- 3 doctoral schools
- 2% of doctoral students for the year 2015/2016
- 18 laboratories (including 5 UMR) and 1 internal laboratory
- 47 theses defended in 2012-2013
- 4 research and development platforms

== Teaching and research ==
=== Institutes and schools ===
The university has a variety of institutes and schools.

- Institute of Business Administration
- University Institute of Technology
- Confucius Institute
- Institute of Illiteracy
- National Institute of Teacher Training and Education
- Superior School of Engineering Reunion Indian Ocean
- Universe Sciences Observatory
- Apprentice Training Center

=== Doctoral Schools ===
- Doctoral School - Law, Economics and Management
- Doctoral School - Technology and Health Sciences
- Doctoral School - Humanities and Social Sciences

== Campuses ==
Its main campus is located near the Rectorate and the headquarters of the Regional Council of La Réunion, in Moufia, Saint-Denis. The university has four other campuses, the Parc Technologique in Bellepierre, the Institut d'administration des entreprises in La Victoire, the faculty in Le Tampon which offers licenses in economic and social administration and law, as well as the Institut universitaire de la technologie in Saint-Pierre in the southwest of the island. The amphitheaters have been named after great scientists who have worked in Reunion, among them :

- Philibert Commerson
- Thérésien Cadet
- Georges Charpak

Le Tampon hosts the Technopole de La Réunion park, in Saint-Denis, some related services.

== Notable people ==
Faculty

- Chantal Conand (born 1943) - marine biologist
- Adrian Mathias (born 1944) - British mathematician working in set theory. The forcing notion Mathias forcing is named for him.
- Hajasoa Vololona Picard (born 1956, in Antananarivo, Madagascar) - literature and linguistics specialist, politician (PS) and writer

Alumni

- Philippe Naillet (born 1960 in Saint-Denis, Réunion) - politician (PS)
- Jean-Régis Ramsamy (born 1966, in Saint-André, Réunion) - reporter, historian and writer
- Ericka Bareigts (born 1967, in Saint-Denis, Réunion) - politician (PS), Minister of Overseas France
- Johnson Roussety (born 1975) - Chief Commissioner of Rodrigues, Mauritius

== See also ==
- List of public universities in France by academy
