= Hajasoa Vololona Picard =

Malagasy-French politician and writer

Hajasoa Vololona Picard Ravololo (born 1956) is a Malagasy-born French academic, politician and writer. Since acquiring French nationality in 1982, she has held a number of cultural and political posts in La Réunion. Her writings include essays, fictional works and poetry.

== Biography ==
Born on 17 April 1956 in Antananarivo, Madagascar, she is the daughter of Malagasy parents who fought for independence in the late 1950s. After passing the baccalauréat in 1973, she earned the Diplôme d'études universitaires générales and a degree in modern literature, leading to a doctorate in linguistics at the Paris-Sorbonne University in 1981. Thereafter she received the CAPES teaching degree in literature from the Réunion Academy.

In the early 1980s, she lectured at the University of Antananarivo before moving to Réunion to teach at the University of La Réunion. There she became involved in politics, first as secretary of the Socialist Party, then at the ministry of sport and culture.

Picard's collection of poems, De Jaspe et de sang, was published in 1998. The work expresses the difficulties she has experienced as a woman in facing up to an unjust world while revealing her attachment to her native Madagascar. Writing in Le Soir, Pierre Maury comments on how she has been inspired by her native country, commenting on its landscapes and rites while evoking how the dead are celebrated by the living in the annual turning of the bones. Her "Vieille chanson d'Imerina", based on the traditional Malagasy hainteny verse form, is an example of how the Spanish language has also exerted an influence on her poetry.

As of 2013, Picard is head of Malagasy Studies at the University of La Réunion where she undertakes linguistic research, specializing in morphology. In November 2013, she presented the paper "Vers une retraduction des normes de dérivation en langue malgache" at the international conference Traduction-Trahison. On the political front, she has served as deputy-mayor of Saint-Denis de la Réunion.
