= Philippe Naillet =

French politician

Member of the National Assembly for Réunion's 1st constituency
- Incumbent
- Assumed office 14 July 2020
- Preceded by: Ericka Bareigts
- In office 12 March 2016 – 17 June 2017
- Preceded by: Ericka Bareigts
- Succeeded by: Ericka Bareigts

Municipal Councillor of Saint-Denis, Reunion
- In office 16 March 2008 – 16 March 2014

Personal details
- Born: 14 August 1960 (age 66) Saint-Denis, Réunion
- Party: Socialist Party
- Education: University of La Réunion

Philippe Naillet (born 14 August 1960 in Saint-Denis, Reunion) is a French politician. A member of the Socialist Party and a municipal councillor of Saint-Denis, he was the substitute for Ericka Bareigts, the successful candidate for Réunion's 1st constituency in the 2012 election. He replaced Bareigts when she was appointed Minister of Overseas France in 2016 and served as deputy until the 2017 election.

== Early life and career ==
Naillet studied at the University of Reunion. He was then a Life Insurance Inspector for AG2R La Mondiale.

== Political positions ==
In 2023, Naillet publicly endorsed the re-election of the Socialist Party's chairman Olivier Faure.
