= Jean-Régis Ramsamy =

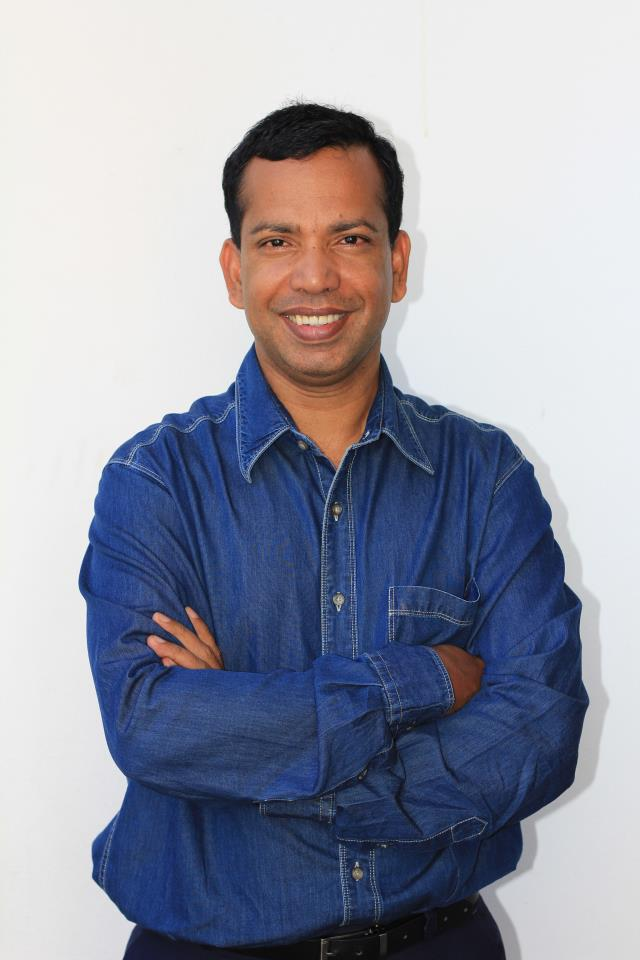
Jean-Régis Ramsamy

Jean-Régis Ramsamy (born April 16 1966) is a Reunionese reporter, historian and writer. He was an anchorman on RFO.

== Background ==
Born in Saint-André, Reunion, he is the son of Antonin Ramsamy and of Norma Sévingué. His father was the last Reunionese jeweler from a Tamil line called Vishwakarma or Patair. This affiliation matters a lot in the author's heart hence the fact that he has dedicated a part of life to reconstitute his family tree. He was named Nadarassin after his great-grandfather Ramsamy Nadarassin – an Indian jeweler who came in the Island around 1890. Thanks to rough and tough research, he finally found out some relatives – the Pavadé Patairs from his father – in Pondichéry. This result has motivated lots of Reunionese from Indian origin to start off research of their own family tree.

== Education ==
In 1988, he attended the University of La Réunion in order to apply for a Tamil Language License, which he did not obtain. In 2000, returned to university to follow a literature course. Then, he did a license of Education Science, a DESS (SIFA), DEA (Contemporary History) before ending with a Doctorae of Contemporary History under Pr. Sudel Fuma's supervision. It was on November 26, 2012, when he presented his thesis.

== Career ==
He first started in Labuse Radio (owning by the ex-mayor Cassam Moussa), then he was a freelance journalist in Journal de L'île. But, this environment gathering numerous professionals didn't open up journalism doors as easily as it could have been. In 1988, he worked for the journal fr:Témoignage. It took him four years before getting his first press card that made him acknowledged by the journalism world. As he said, he had to cover some local and regional events before being accepted by the profession. In 1989, he covered – for Korail Radio – Pope Jean-Paul II and PM Michel Rocard's venues in the island. Throughout this year, he also covered the repatriation to South Africa of the mercenary Bob Denard at Moroni Airport. In 1991, as his colleagues he was surprised by Chaudron social events. He was covering these events for Korail Radio while the newspaper Le Mauricien called on his service as well. Following these reports, he finally start to work for RFO (Radio France Outre-Mer) which today is Réunion Première (Groupe France Télévision).

== Publications ==
To a regional scale, his publications have enlightened the Indo-Reunionese legacy. Nalgon, le bal tamoul à La Réunion has led the world culture houses to be interested in Tamil Bal, Nalgon. Thus, the group La sapel la mizer teamed up in Paris. La Galaxie des noms malbars allowed him to be quoted in a work directed by the University of Johns Hopkins. His first academic dissertation brought him to his family's origin through research at the Archives and to some countries that have welcomed the Indian diaspora. Finally, this study will be published by Éditions Azalées in October 1999. This book is an ethno-historical essay but as well a memorial on the Tamil jeweler families that have settled up in Mauritius, South Africa and French oversea territories.

- Nalgon, le bal tamoul à La Réunion, éd. Azalées, 1999
- Histoire des bijoutiers indiens de La Réunion, 1999, Azalées éditions, 160 pages
- Identités et Représentations des Indiens à La Réunion au XIX^{e} siècle, 12 pages, Grahter, 2002
- Journal d'un Réunionnais en Inde, éd. Azalées, 2003
- La Galaxie des noms malbar, Jean-Régis Ramsamy-Nadarassin, Az. éd, Sainte-Marie, 2006
- La turquoise, l'aventure des Réunionnais d'origine indienne, 2014

== Links with India ==
Moreover, his works, he keeps searching over Reunion-Mauritius-India. In 2007, he created the ODI with the publisher Christian Vittori, and the researchers Gilles Sagodira, Thierry Imidi-Maavouba and Véronique Smith. Although initiated in Jawaharlal Nehru University, by Ajay Dubey, the one in Reunion Island deeply wants to keep its local identity. ODI Reunion contributes to research and over all to link up Indian and Reunionese's researchers. Frequently, students collaborate with ODI Réunion. In 2009, an exposition of photographies of Indian indentured servant was organised in Chennai. In 2012, ODI Reunion organised its first international gathering, under supervision of L'Université de La Réunion. Furthermore, Jean-Régis Ramsamy was chosen by India to speak for Reunionese Diaspora during the PBD (Prâvasi Bharatiya Divas). This major annual gathering event has gathered 1500 former administratives in the Indian capitol, New-Delhi. Also, he spoke in South Africa in 2010, in Mauritius in 2012 and in Guadeloupe in 2013. On January 9, 2021, he received the Pravasi Bharatiya Samman.
