= 2010 Réunionese Regional Council election =

Regional Council elections were held in Réunion in 2010 as part of the French regional elections. Although the Alliance for Réunion received the most votes in the first round, it was defeated by the OR–UMP–NC–LGM alliance in the second round. The OR–UMP–NC–LGM alliance won 27 of the 45 seats.

== Results ==
Party	First round		Second round		Seats	+/–
Party	Votes	%	Votes	%	Seats	+/–
Alliance for Réunion (PCR–FD–MoDem)	71,638	30.22	112,201	35.55	12	–15
OR–UMP–NC–LGM	62,643	26.43	143,485	45.46	27	16
PS–MRC	30,970	13.07	59,933	18.99	6	–1
Réunion Nout'Fierté	15,959	6.73			0	New
Better Future for the People of Réunion in France and Europe	14,023	5.92			0	0
Miscellaneous Right Movement	12,734	5.37			0	New
For Total Equality	11,818	4.99			0	New
Europe Ecology	11,700	4.94			0	New
Nasion Rénioné	2,097	0.88			0	0
Lutte Ouvrière	1,945	0.82			0	0
Réunionese Democratic Union	231	0.10			0	New
Independents	1,269	0.54			0	0
Total	237,027	100.00	315,619	100.00	45	0
Valid votes	237,027	95.12	315,619	96.04		
Invalid/blank votes	12,161	4.88	13,005	3.96		
Total votes	249,188	100.00	328,624	100.00		
Registered voters/turnout	550,399	45.27	550,480	59.70		
Source: French Politics, Ministry of the InteriorLA REUNION (974) Résultats par commune
