= L'Union (French newspaper) =

French daily newspaper

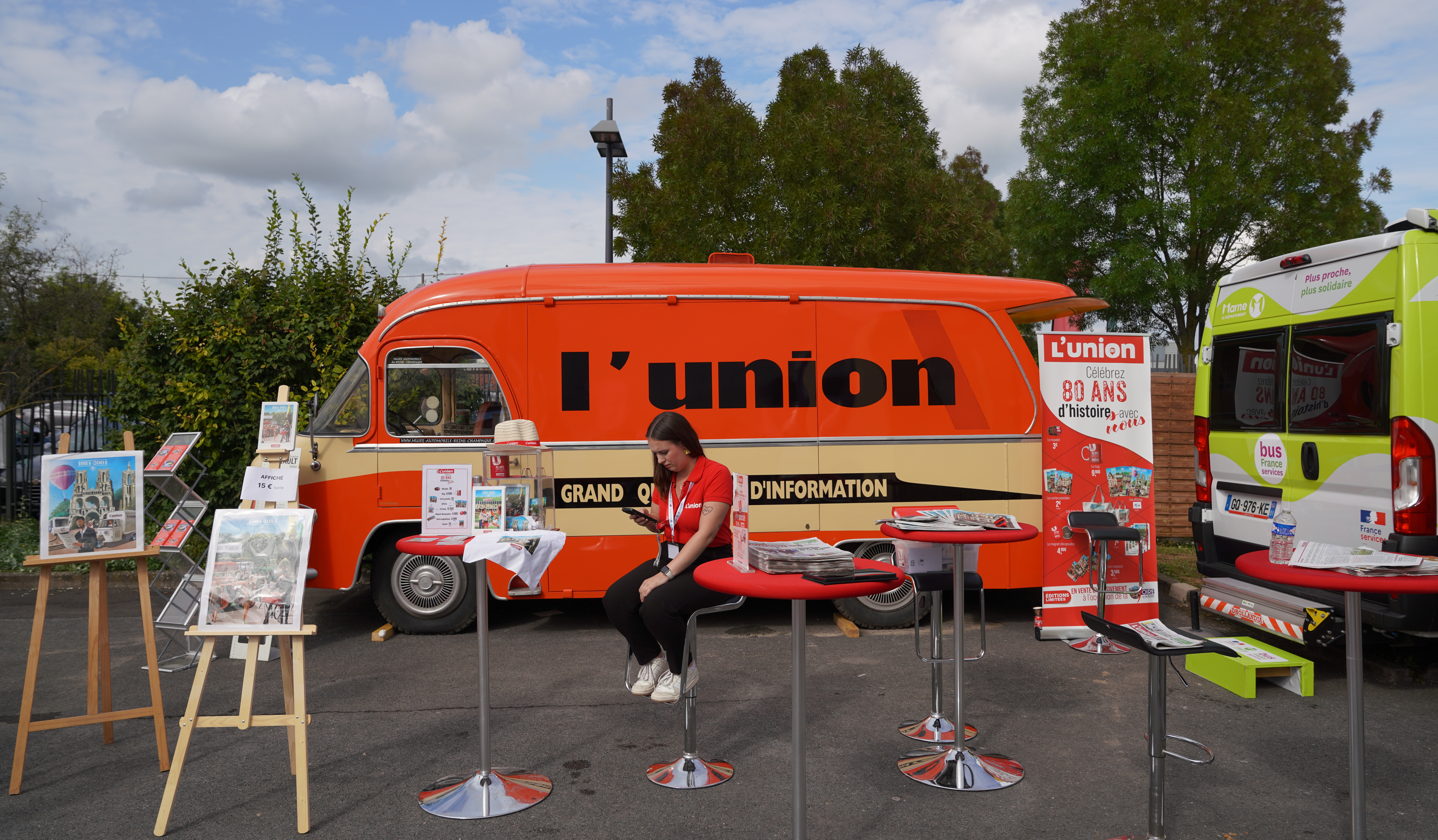
- Type: Daily newspaper
- Format: Tabloid
- Owner: Groupe Rossel
- Editor-in-chief: Arnault Cohen
- Founded: 1944; 81 years ago
- Language: French
- Headquarters: Reims, France
- Circulation: 95,000 (2012)
- ISSN: 0751-6134 (print); 2491-5734 (web)
- OCLC number: 74813811
- Website: lunion.fr

L'Union (French pronunciation: [lynjɔ̃]) is a French daily newspaper based in Reims. It was first printed in 1944 as an underground newspaper of the French Resistance.

== History ==
L'Union was born from a 1943 meeting in Reims, Occupied France, between Henri Bertin of Ceux de la Résistance, Charles Guggiari of Libération-Nord, Raymond Guyot of the French Section of the Workers' International (SFIO), and "Maurice", the alias of a member of the National Front. Bertin would later flee to Great Britain, while the latter three were deported to Nazi concentration camps.

The newspaper's first issue was written by Michel Sicre, future president of the Departmental Committee of Liberation; Henri Kinet, a schoolteacher and member of the National Front; Robert Duterque, a member of the SFIO; and Edmond Forboteau, a member of Libération-Nord. It was printed clandestinely by resistance fighter Serge Labruyère in April 1944. 5,000 copies of the newspaper's first official issue were distributed in Reims on 30 August 1944.

On 27 September 1945, the newspaper was set up as a SARL with 12 owner associations: the National Front, Ceux de la Libération, Ceux de la Résistance, Libération-Nord, the Union des femmes françaises, the Union française des associations de combattants, the Marne federation of the SFIO, the Marne federation of the French Communist Party, the Union départementale des syndicats ouvriers de la Marne, the Alliance républicaine de la Marne, the mouvement républicain de la Marne, and the Union locale des syndicats chrétiens de Reims.

Groupe Hersant Média (GHM) acquired the newspaper in 1985. In October 2012, GHM sold the newspaper to Groupe Rossel.

== Notable personnel ==
- Pierre-Jean Bozo
- Thierry de Cabarrus
- Herve Chabaud
- Daniel Hutier
- Sébastien Lacroix
- Yves Lavoquer
- Michel Nozière
- Jacques Tillier
