= Joëlle Écormier =

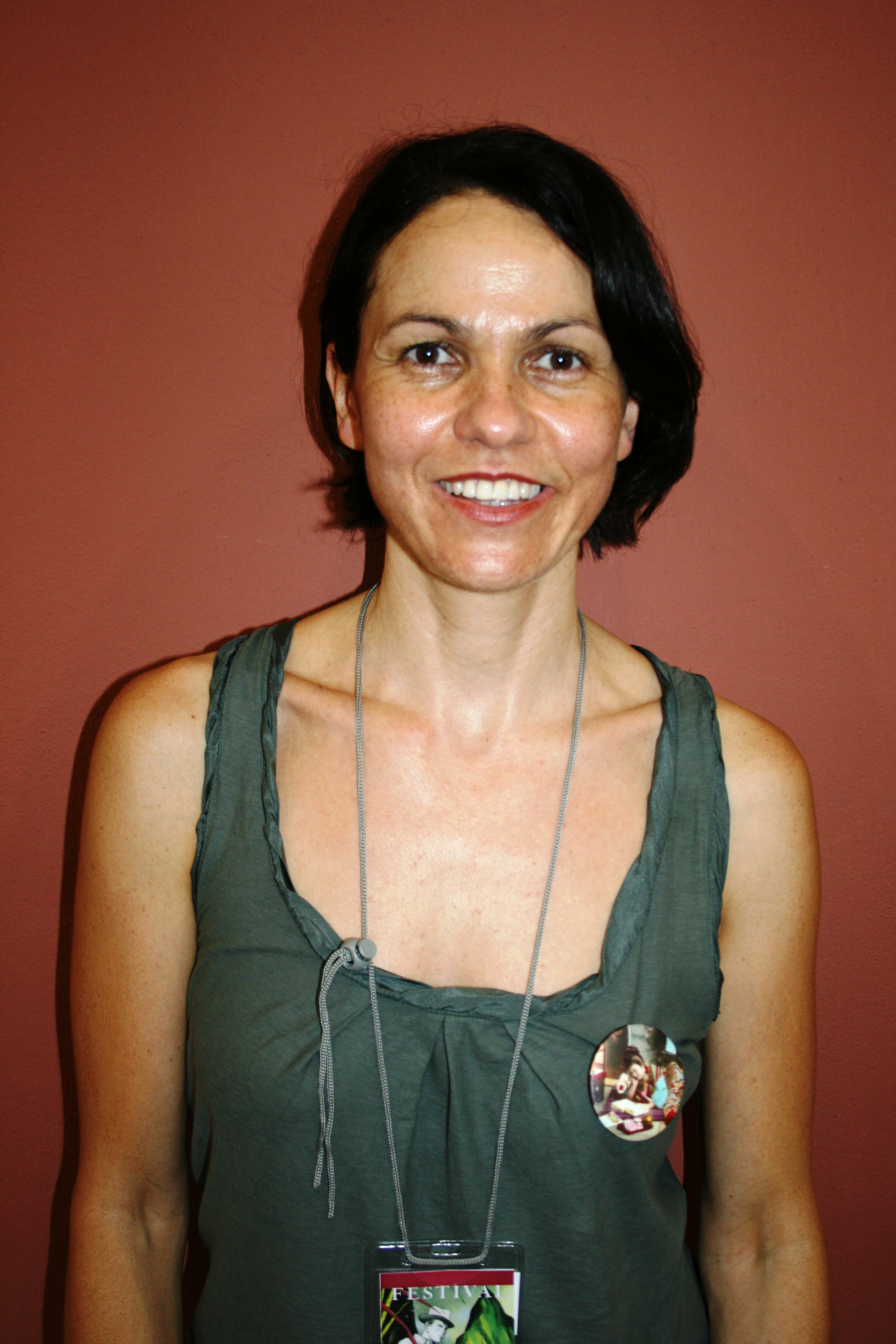
- Joëlle Écormier at the 6th Book and Comic Festival on December 9, 2009 in Saint-Denis, Réunion
- Born: March 31, 1967 (age 59); Le Tampon; La Réunion; France
- Occupation: Writer
- Writing career
- Language: French

Joëlle Écormier (born March 31, 1967, in Le Tampon, Réunion), is a French writer.

After writing for herself during her childhood, she was a homemaker when she participated in a literary experiment launched by the book club France Loisirs in 1998: the collaborative writing of a novel whose first pages were endorsed by Yann Queffélec, and whose later pages were to be chosen from international submissions. The selection of her submission for the second chapter of this collaborative work of fiction, which appeared in 1999 under the title 30 jours à tuer ("Thirty Days to Kill") led the young woman to launch herself into a career as a writer.

Écormier's first independent novel, Le Grand Tamarinier ("The Big Tamarind Tree"), was published by the Réunion publishing house Azalées Éditions in 2000. Le Grand Tamarinier created a child and began a shift towards children's literature, which she pursued with her second work, a tale illustrated by her daughter's drawings. In fact, after 2003 and the appearance of her second novel, Plus léger que l'air ("Lighter Than Air"), Joëlle Écormier, switching to Océan Éditions ("Ocean Editions"), dedicated herself to works for very small children. She attempted to modernize children by avoiding motifs from Réunion cultural folklore. Only in 2009 did she return to books without illustrations by publishing a collection of short stories for adolescents, Je t'écris du pont ("I write to you about the bridge"), and, above all, her third novel, Le Petit Désordre de la mer ("The Little Disorder of the Sea"). Le Petit Désordre de la mer won an award the same year at the Book and Comic Festival in Saint-Denis, Réunion.

== Biography ==
=== Youth and path before publishing ===
Joëlle Écormier was born in 1967 in Le Tampon, a township located in the southern part of the island Réunion, a French overseas department in the southwestern Indian Ocean. Since the time she was very young, she wrote texts for herself, which she did not publish. She passed a literary baccalaureate (equivalent to a high school diploma) during the time of her schooling.

Dreaming of speaking English every day, she entered college for the first year of a DEUG, (similar to an associate degree). However, disappointed, she quickly abandoned her studies. Nonetheless, she obtained an interpreter-guide certificate, allowing her to practice the language with English-speaking tourists. Joëlle Écormier always writes in an open manner, and her path took her to live at Cherbourg, then at Toulouse. Furthermore, she became the mother of two children whom she raised for ten years before rejoining the workforce as saleswoman in a large bookstore.

=== 30 jours à tuer ===
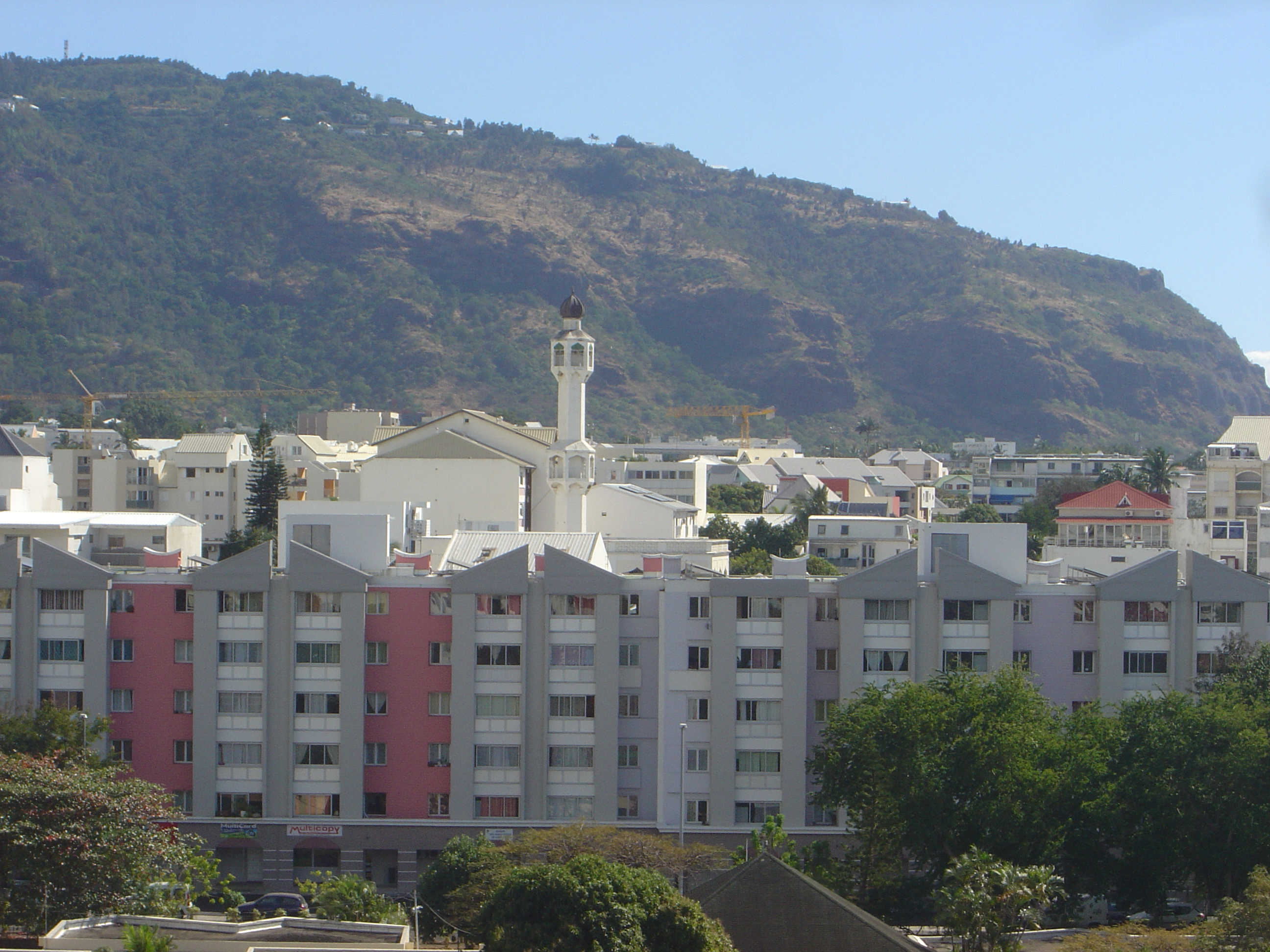
View of Saint-Denis with the battlement of La Montagne in the background, neighborhood where Joëlle Écormier wrote the second chapter of 30 jours à tuer.

Back in Réunion and living from that point on in La Montagne, a neighborhood of the capital, Saint-Denis, she again became a homemaker when she participated in an original literary project launched by the book club France Loisirs in the course of 1998: the writing of a novel whose preliminary chapter was endorsed by the writer Yann Queffélac, while other authors were chosen from the messages sent from anonymous Internet users. In their proposal, these authors had to develop their plot in the same way that it was begun by the author of The Savage Wedding, Goncourt Prize laureate in 1985. But Queffélec, inspired by a recent event in the United States, imagined the story of Clara Turner, a young American who, condemned to death for having killed her viola professor, is granted by the State governor a 30-day sentence. What she will do with these thirty days must be the subject of the novel, whose first chapter is published on the France Loisirs website.

In the text that she submitted for the second chapter, Joëlle Écormier gave life to the character of the lawyer, Clara, M. Hopeking. Écormier conjured up the strategy that the young woman puts in place in order to escape her death, which is scheduled a month later. Convinced, the jury adopted Écormier's text, which from then on became the official version from which the Internet users must create, proposing a third chapter. After her, the jury holds onto the proposal from Marceline Breton, editor and free-lance designer working in Hanover, as well as those of Patrice Sickerson, technical head at French Télécom living in metropolitan Verrières-le-Buisson; Christophe Tissier, website creator living in Antony; Louis-Olivier Dupin, a local of Grenoble working as a supervisory staff agent in a transportation company; and finally, Christophe Sancy, publicist in Tervuren, Belgium. Trente jours à tuer, termed the "first novel created on the internet," appeared in 1999 after some changes were made to the different chapter for the purpose of increasing coherence between the written works of the seven authors. The circulation is guaranteed, exclusively, by France Loisirs. Encouraged by this experience, Joëlle Écormier started up in the career of author.

=== First novels written alone ===
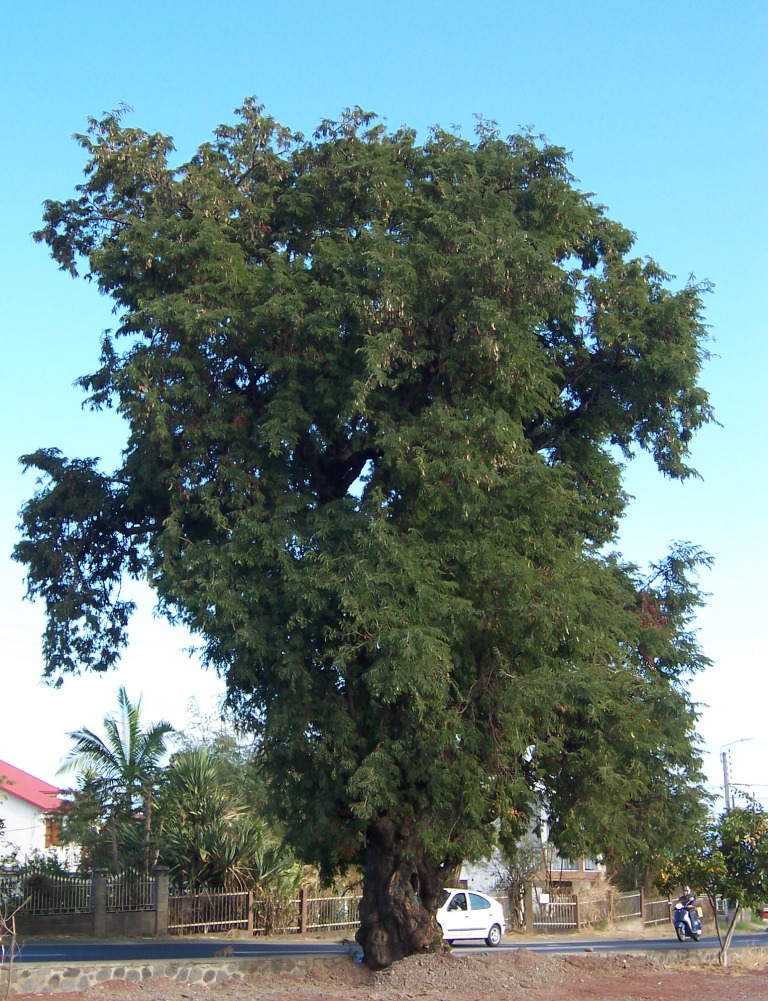
A Reunion tamarind species, the tree which gave the title of Grand Tamarinier, released in 2000.

After having been rejected by numerous publishers, who considered that the novel did not correspond to the format of their collections, the first novel written by Joëlle Écormier only appeared in 2000 in the Azalea Publishers, a Réunion publishing house. Entitled "Le Grand Tamarinier" (The Grand Tamarind), it is about the history of a small boy called Louis who, beaten by his alcoholic father, finds the strength to rebel in order to embark upon a trip to the borders of the imaginary. Lending to the story, and readable by all the public, the plot puts him in contact with a tree, a tamarind near which he is able to start afresh. Guided by the counsel of this tree, the hero leaves in search of the secret that will allow him to finally find the peace of childhood. In the meantime, he encounters numerous animals of Réunion bestiary: among others, a turtle, a chameleon, a papangue, a rat, a dolphin or a Phaethon that teaches him to fly. According to Eva Baguey, author of the doctoral thesis on childhood literature and Réunion youth, this fact is relatively important because Békali allows the heroes, from a metamorphic point of view, to pass from the world of childhood to adulthood. The work is illustrated with photos that stage the son of Joëlle Écormier as the hero. They were taken by her husband Gilles.

The same year, still at the same editor, the author published a children's story, La Petite Fleur et le soleil. This time, she illustrated with drawings by her ten-year-old daughter, Marie. A question her daughter expressed when she was no more than four years of age is at the beginning of the work: "And if one day that sun didn't rise?" Additionally, the story that takes place in Réunion, and told by an old sunflower, is about the adventures of a little, pure flower that is trying to find how to make the sun, who decided one morning to no longer get up, leave his bed. The work is only distributed by direct sales on the island of Réunion. In fact, the author felt obliged to write the end in Réunion creole to be able to publish it. Whatever the case may be, a year after its release, the story was adapted into a musical by the author herself and Michèle Millasseau. They wrote seven original songs together. The show was played at the Phillippe-Vinson de La Montagne school on June 30, 2000.

The second novel by Écormier appeared in 2003, the year after which she was put in charge of promoting writing at the library in Saint-Denis, the François-Mitterrand House of Communication. This lead her to facilitate writing workshops in the academic realm. In Plus léger que l'air, the main character is Joséphine, a pretty publisher on the verge of getting married when a letter from Réunion constrains her to return to her native island to settle an estate. On this trip, she is confronted with people from her childhood. The work is part of a few rare titles of Reunion literature cited under the corresponding section of English tour guide books that Lonely Planet sanctions, in Maurice and in Seychelles in 2004 and 2007. It benefited from the participation of Andy Le Sauce, a freediver author with numerous world records who has lived on the island for many years.

=== Inauguration of a children's collection ===
An admirer of Antoine de Saint-Exupéry's Petit Prince (The Little Prince), Joëlle Écormier entered a three-year period beginning in 2006 in which she published fifteen works of children's literature. Shifting to another Réunion publisher, Océan Éditions, she first put forward N'oublie pas que je m'appelle Octavie ("Don't forget that my name is Octavie"). The album, illustrated by Modeste Madoré and addressed to children of age six and up, tells the story of a pair of octopuses, Octavie and Octébo, who have conflicting dreams: Octavie hopes to get his octopus doctorate, but Octébo just wants to start a big family.

The same year, in the same collection and targeting the same age range, Joëlle Écormier also came out with Le Pays Dézétoiles (A word play on "The Country of the Stars"), illustrated by Laure Seabra, and then Mais que fait grand-mère Kalle?, illustrated by Nathalie Millet. Le Pays Dézétoiles describes a little star, Tizétoile, who does not know how to shine like the others. Tizétoile is called a "zétoile," making a play-off the word for star, "étoile." Mais que fait grand-mère Kalle? describes a classic Réunion character, the witch Grandmother Kalle. intending to help young readers of age three and up explore her daily life near the volcano Piton de la Fournaise. In fact, these three titles form the first three children's books published by Océan Éditions, inaugurating her collection Ocean Youth.

The author again picked up the premise of Mais que fait grand-mère Kalle? in 2008 with two more works, one on the daily life of La Buse, famous historical pirate of Réunion and the Indian Ocean^{,}, and the other on the daily life of the dodo, this bird endemic to Mauritius and extinct in the real world. According to the publisher, "In this series, the author enjoys unveiling the hidden face of legends or famous characters from here and elsewhere." In doing so, according to Joëlle Écormier herself, she endeavors to avoid motifs from Réunion folklore and its children's literature by doing away with what she considers the typical character, the little tenrec living on its volcano.
