= Auguste Legros =

French politician

Auguste Legros (French pronunciation: [oɡyst ləɡʁo]; 30 December 1922 – 30 May 2008) was a politician of La Réunion island. He was Member of Parliament for Réunion's 1st constituency from 1988 to 1993.
