= René-Paul Victoria =

French politician

Mayor of Saint-Denis, Réunion
- In office 2001–2008
- Preceded by: Michel Tamaya
- Succeeded by: Gilbert Annette

Member of the National Assembly for Réunion's 1st constituency
- In office 2002–2012
- Preceded by: Michel Tamaya
- Succeeded by: Ericka Bareigts

Personal details
- Born: 27 August 1954 (age 71) Sainte-Suzanne, Réunion
- Party: The Republicans

René-Paul Victoria (French pronunciation: [ʁəne pɔl viktɔʁja]; born August 27, 1954 in Sainte-Suzanne, Réunion) was a member of the National Assembly of France, representing the island of Réunion.

He was a candidate for the National Assembly in 1997, and lost against Michel Tamaya.

He was elected mayor of Saint-Denis, Réunion in 2001 against the socialist Michel Tamaya. In 2009, he lost the elections against Gilbert Annette of the socialist party.

He was elected to the National Assembly of France, defeating the deputy of Saint-Denis, Réunion, Michel Tamaya in 2002 and was reelected in 2008 against Gilbert Annette with 51,46% of votes.

In 2008 he left UMP - Union for a Popular Movement together with other Reunion Politicians and founded "Objective Réunion".

In 2014 he was condemned to 3 years of ineligibility.

In 2015 he was excluded from the party Les Republicans.
