= Journal de l'île de La Réunion =

French-language newspaper on the isle of Réunion

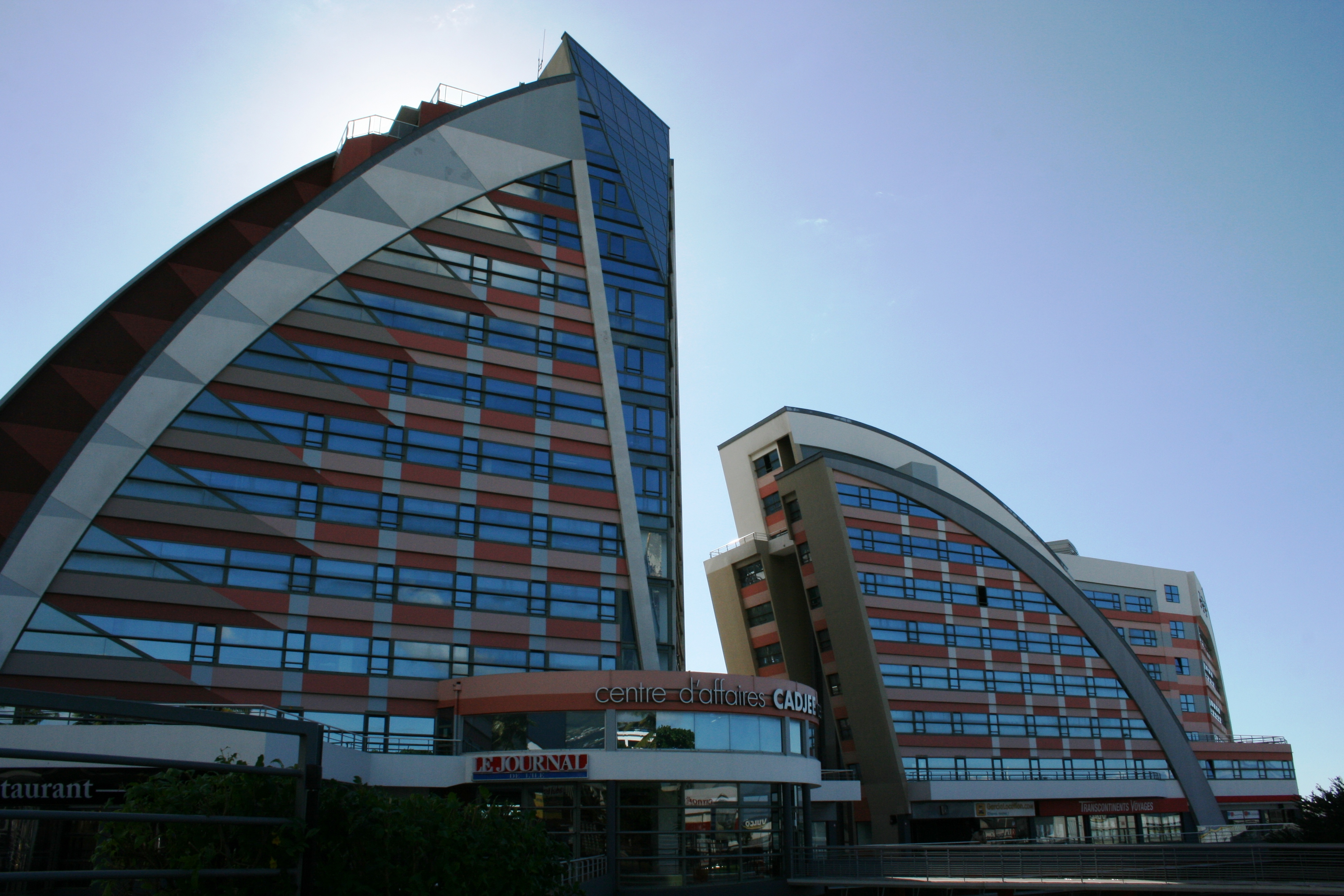
The Centre d'affaires Cadjee in Saint-Denis where the offices of Journal de l'île de La Réunion were headquartered.

Journal de l'île de La Réunion was a daily, French-language newspaper published in Réunion, a French overseas department. It was abruptly shut down on July 31, 2024. The newspaper, which was founded in 1951 was headquartered in Saint-Denis, Réunion, and was owned by Groupe Hersant Média. There are four competing newspapers in Réunion.
