= Television in Botswana =

Botswana first got television in 1988. Unlike other countries in the region, it was a private company that started the first station (the Gaborone Broadcasting Company). State-owned television began only on 31 July 2000 with the launch of Botswana Television. Botswana is one of the two countries in Africa that employs the ISDB-T standard; the other being Angola.

== History ==
Television in Botswana was virtually nonexistent during the country's first two decades as an independent country, outside of film units from news editors as early as 1968. In February 1984, President Ketumile Masire suggested the introduction of a television service in the country, saying that broadcast media was incomplete without television. In late November 1984, a "new television network for Botswana" was already being considered. In February 1986, it was revealed within government that setting up a television station was "too expensive to maintain".

A 1988 feasibility study report issued by the International Telecommunication Union suggested that Botswana should operate a small-scale commercial television station. The report had the consultation of Radio Botswana, several government ministries and the University of Botswana. The recommendations suggested that the television service should foster a national identity, as an educational tool and increase awareness of health and modern farming. However, the process was hampered by the growing violence and massive social concerns at the time of the apex of HIV/AIDS, as well as "portrayal of affluent lifestyle" and concerns that advertising would bring consumerist culture. If the government insisted, the ITU would change the concept of the then-planned service to a public service broadcaster as opposed to a commercial broadcaster. By 1989, the plan for a service was touted as being "extremely weak", and that 1.5% of the Botswanan population should have access to a television set, if such a service started. The ITU suggested that television viewing centres would be set up but the government refused over maintenance costs. Botswana's sixth National Development Plan suggested that a television service would start between 1985 and 1991.

In the same year as the release of the ITU feasibility study, a limited television service began in Gaborone: the Gaborone Broadcasting Company. The station faced reluctance from signals coming from South Africa, and operated as a closed-circuit television station until the early 2000s. GBC was a charter affiliate of TVAfrica when it launched in 1998.

The government spent more than a decade trying to set up its own television channel. The Institute of Development Management suggested that the state channel would have a heavy amount of local programming and be apolitical in nature. It would also prevent the idea that it wouldn't act as an "embarrassment" to local SABC and M-Net viewers. During the 1990s, Bop TV of Bophuthatswana (where Tswana was an official language) was relayed terrestrially in Gaborone, being replaced by BTV upon launch in 2000.

Botswana Television was formed in January 1998, aiming to launch by April 1999, ahead of the general election. After a series of delays, BTV finally started broadcasting on 31 July 2000 and was Africa's first television station to rely exclusively on digital equipment. In August 2002, GBC obtained a full broadcasting licence, converting the existing station to terrestrial broadcasting, having also set up terrestrial transmitters in Francistown and Selebi-Phikwe. The closure of TVAfrica put the station in limbo, causing it to fill the gaps left by the former partner with new local programmes. The status of film and television production in Botswana at the time was considered "infantile", leading to BTV's rejection of Room 101, being picked up by GBC instead.

GBC was acquired by Sabido Investments, owners of e.tv, the South African private network, assisting them in their nationwide expansion project and technical upgrades. On 15 July 2008, GBC unveiled its new schedule; the channel was subsequently renamed eBotswana in 2010.

Until 2013, most Botswanans watched SABC channels illegally using satellite dishes, colloquially known in Botswana as Philibao, the name of one of the manufacturers. Sentech was still using analogue signals (inherited from AstraSat) to deliver its programming, which Botswanans thought to be superior than local channels, and planned to shut down the signals by the 2010 FIFA World Cup. The signals were switched off on 1 July 2013.

On 10 May 2021, eBotswana, now under the control of YMH Media Group, was renamed YTV. With the shutdown of analogue television in Botswana, BTV introduced a new three-channel network on 2 October 2022: BTV 1 (entertainment), BTV 2 (education) and BTV News.

== Digital terrestrial television ==
On 26 February 2013, Botswana became the first country in Africa to employ the Japanese ISDB-T standard, after comparative testing with DVB-T2. On 29 July 2013, Botswana Television started digital broadcasting.

Analogue terrestrial signals were switched off on 2 October 2022.
