= Hilary Ng'weno =

Kenyan historian and journalist(1938–2021)

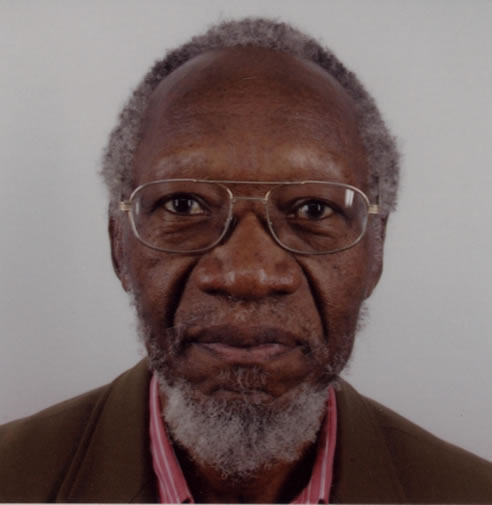
- Born: Hilary Boniface Ng’weno; June 28, 1938; Nairobi, Kenya
- Died: July 7, 2021 (aged 83)
- Occupation: Journalist
- Spouse: Fleur Ng'weno

Hilary Boniface Ng'weno (1938–2021) was a Kenyan historian and journalist. Ng'weno was best known as the editor-in-chief of the Weekly Review, a weekly news magazine that ran from 1975 to 1999. He was also the founder of The Nairobi Times and Kenya's first independent TV news station, STV. He was the producer of documentary films on Kenyan history, including The Making of a Nation and Kenya's Darkest Hour.

== Early life ==
Ng'weno was born in Nairobi in 1938 to Regina and Morris Onyango. After graduating from Harvard University with a degree in nuclear physics, he worked as a reporter for the Daily Nation for nine months before his appointment as the newspaper's first Kenyan editor-in-chief. He resigned in 1965 and pursued a career in journalism for more than forty years. In 1973, together with Terry Hirst, he founded Joe, a political satire comic magazine that circulated in many parts of Africa until ceasing publication in the late 1970s.

== Career in journalism ==
In 1975, Ng'weno founded The Weekly Review, a journal of political news, commentary, and analysis, followed in 1977 by The Nairobi Times, a Sunday newspaper that later became a daily. Initially, The Weekly Review and The Nairobi Times, being locally owned enterprises, fared well in a field dominated by the then foreign-owned Daily Nation and The Standard. However, like other local papers, they faced stiff competition from the established papers for advertising from the mostly foreign companies in Kenya. Because the advertising community was still controlled by foreigners, it tended to favour the foreign-owned publications. Advertisers were also reluctant to deal with publications that were likely to stir the wrath of the government with inflammatory political reports.

Ng'weno's publications lasted for many years. His publications continued to gain popularity, and The Weekly Review dominated the weekly news market for more than 20 years, becoming one of Africa's leading news magazines. Due to diminishing advertising revenue, Ng'weno sold The Nairobi Times in 1983 to KANU, Kenya's then ruling party. The paper was renamed The Kenya Times, but its popularity suffered, as it was seen to be the mouthpiece of an oppressive government in a political era likened to dictatorship. The Kenya Times ceased publication in July 2010.

Ng'weno diversified his media empire, which included other periodicals such as The Financial Review, The Industrial Review, and Rainbow, a monthly children's magazine. His publishing company, Stellascope, was acquired by KANU when the latter purchased The Nairobi Times. The Weekly Review folded on May 17, 1999, after 24 years of publication, and Ng'weno moved on to television broadcasting, launching the television station STV Kenya.

Following the sale of STV in 2000, Ng'weno reinvented himself as a historian, drawing on materials from his journalistic career. In collaboration with the Nation Media Group, he produced the 15-part series The Making of a Nation (2007). In collaboration with NTV, he produced over 160 individual half-hour profiles of important figures in Kenya's history, a series entitled Makers of a Nation.

== Personal life ==
Hilary Ng'weno was married to Fleur (née Grandjouan), a native of France, for nearly fifty years. Fleur Ng'weno, a naturalist, writer, and former editor, holds a BSc degree in conservation from the University of Michigan. She has been actively involved in environmental issues in Kenya for more than forty years, serving as Honorary Secretary to NatureKenya (formerly the East Africa Natural History Society). Their two daughters, Amolo Ng'weno and Bettina Ng'weno, are also distinguished in education and media. The Harvard- and Princeton-educated Amolo served as deputy director of financial services for the poor at the Bill & Melinda Gates Foundation. In 1994, Amolo, together with two other Kenyans, Ayisi Makatiani and Karanja Gakio, founded Africa Online, one of the first internet service providers in Africa. The three met while students in Cambridge, Massachusetts. Bettina Ng'weno is an associate professor of African American and African studies at the University of California, Davis.

== Death ==
Hilary Ng'weno died on July 7, 2021, at his home after a long illness, according to his family. He was survived by his wife, Fleur Ng'weno, and two daughters, Amolo and Bettina Ng'weno.

== Positions held ==
- Member of the Board of Trustees of the National Museums of Kenya (1964–68)
- Chairman of the Kenya Museum Society (1967–68)
- Chairman of Kenya Wildlife Service (1990–93)
- Trustee of World Wide Fund for Nature (1993–97)
- Member of the Council of African Advisers to the World Bank (1991–94)
- Chairman of the Kenya Revenue Authority (1995–97)
- Member of Presidential Economic Commission (1996–99)
- Member of the Population Advisory Committee of the MacArthur Foundation (1991–97)
- Chairman of the advisory board of the Rockefeller Foundation’s African Forum for Children's Literacy in Science and Technology (1994–97)

== Publications ==
=== Books ===
- The Men From Pretoria (1977)
- The Day Kenyatta Died (1978)

=== Magazines ===
- Joe, the humour magazine (with artist Terry Hirst and Oscar Festus)

=== TV productions ===
- Makers of a Nation, which won the Best TV Script award for Hilary Ng'weno at the Kalasha Awards 2010.
- The Making of a Nation: Kenya’s Political History 1957–2007, a 14-part half-hour documentary based on the political course of Kenya from pre-1963 to 2007.
- Kenya’s Darkest Hour

== Prize ==
- John D. Rockefeller III Award, 1968.
