= Radio-Télévision Analamanga =

Television station

- Company type: Private
- Industry: television
- Founded: 1996
- Headquarters: Antananarivo, Madagascar
- Owner: Radio-Télévision Analamanga

Radio-Télévision Analamanga is a Malagasy privately-owned television station founded in 1996 by Ottavio Ermini, an Italian audiovisual specialist. It operates on UHF channel 33 in Antananarivo and is also available on the three subscription television operators of the country: Canal+ Madagascar, StarTimes and Blueline.

== History ==
RTA was founded in 1996 by Ottavio Ermini, but was acquired by a group of French businessmen in 1997, including Gilbert Binny, later to Edgar Razafindravahy, a local businessman. RTA relayed TVAfrica, the barter syndication network, when it existed in the early 2000s, and, on 3 December 1999, joined RFO Réunion and the Mauritius Broadcasting Corporation in providing content for a newly-launched regional satellite channel, Télévision Océan Indien. Ermini, which had briefly controlled the channel shortly after founding, died of mysterious circumstances in 2002. As of May 2002, it operated stations in Antananarivo (head station), Antsirabe, Tamatave and Majunga, all of which producing their news bulletins. In 2003, it took part in the creation of a new regional television channel, King TV, from Mauritius.

One of its characteristics since launch was the lack of a traditional newscast, instead relying on news flashes covering certain events. Its entertainment programming, such as Pazzapa, made the station famous. By 2007, Razafinravahy took over the control of RTA, aligning it with his print and radio assets. His takeover also implied the creation of a full newscast.

In 2010, RTA launched three initiatives, the Miss Madagascar beauty pageant, which hadn't been held for a long period, a talent competition named Vox Pop, slightly different from Pazzapa, and Tout'Ar, a magazine on the arts scene. On 1 April 2011, RTA moved its western office from Ampasika to Mahajanga. This was as part of a gradual refurbishing of its offices across Madagascar. Antananarivo had done so in March and Toamasina was expected to follow by the end of April.
