= 1993 Réunionese Regional Council election =

Council election

Early Regional Council elections were held in Réunion in June 1993. The Free Dom party remained the largest on the Council, winning 12 of the 45 seats.

== Background ==
Following the 1992 elections, Free Dom formed an alliance with Communist Party, with the two holding 26 seats. Free Dom leader Camille Sudre was subsequently elected President of the Council with a majority of 27 votes.

However, the Socialist Party launched an appeal against the election results, make accusations of media bias due to Radio Free-DOM, owned by Sudre, had campaigned in his favour. In May 1993 the French Conseil d'Etat annulled the results of the elections, and fresh elections were arranged for the following month.

Margie Sudre, wife of Camille, took over as lead candidate on the Free Dom list.

== Results ==
Party	Seats	+/–
Free Dom	12	–5
Union for French Democracy	10	–
Rally for the Republic	8	–
Communist Party of Réunion	9	0
Socialist Party	6	+1
Total	45	0
Source: French Politics

== Aftermath ==
Following the elections, Margie Sudre was elected President of the Council, receiving the support of the Communist Party of Réunion and three Socialist Party councillors.
