= 1992 Réunionese general election =

Elections in the French overseas department of Réunion

Elections to both the Regional Council and General Council were held in Réunion on 22 March 1992, as part of the French regional elections. The Free Dom party emerged as the largest in the Regional Council, winning 17 of the 45 seats.

== Results ==
=== Regional Council ===
Party	Votes	%	Seats	+/–
Free Dom		30.80	17	New
RPR–UDF		25.63	14	–4
Communist Party of Réunion		17.94	9	–4
Socialist Party		10.54	5	–1
RPR dissidents (Auguste Legros)		4.94	0	New
Greens		1.64	0	New
Ecology Generation		1.46	0	New
Other green parties		1.30	0	New
National Front		1.24	0	0
Independents		4.51	0	New
Total			45	0
Source: French Politics

=== General Council ===
Party	Seats	+/–
Right-wing independents	20	+1
Communist Party of Réunion	12	+3
Socialist Party	6	+2
Others	9	–
Total	47	+3
Source: Europa World Year Book

== Aftermath ==
Following the elections, Free Dom formed an alliance with Communist Party, with the two holding 26 seats. Free Dom leader Camille Sudre was subsequently elected President of the Council with a majority of 27 votes.

However, the Socialist Party launched an appeal against the election results, make accusations of media bias due to Radio Free-DOM, owned by Sudre, had campaigned in his favour. In May 1993 the French Conseil d'Etat annulled the results of the elections. Fresh elections were held the following month.
