= Frank Odoi (cartoonist) =

Kenyan artist (c.1947–2012)

- Born: c. 1947 Tarkwa, Ghana
- Died: 2012 (aged 63–64) Nairobi, Kenya
- Area: Cartoonist
- Notable works: Akokhan, Golgoti
- Awards: Cartoonist of the Year Award Kenya 1985, 1986, 2004. Cartoonist of the Year Award Ghana 2005.

Frank Odoi, one of Africa's foremost cartoonists, was born in the mining town of Tarkwa in western Ghana in 1948. (Note: The Daily Nation gives his year of birth as 1947. Frank Odoi in an interview with Kimani wa Wanjiru (see reference 3 below) gives his own year of birth as 1948.) He was the only boy amongst seven sisters. He lost his father at an early age and was primarily raised by his mother. He was married to Monicah Asami, who later changed her name to Caroline Odoi. They had three daughters Maureen Atulo, Francesca Ajua Odoi and Francine Ashardey Odoi.

== Life and career ==
After completing elementary school, Frank tried to join the military but was rejected because he was underage. So he enrolled at The Ghanatta School of Fine Arts and Design and later found work at the Medical School in Ghana where he worked as an assistant medical artist.

In the late 1970s, Odoi emigrated to Kenya where he joined up with the doyen of Kenyan cartoonists, Terry Hirst, and became a contributor to Hirst's illustrated humour magazine Joe. As Hirst recalls, "Frank had seen a copy of Joe magazine in Ghana, and just turned up in Nairobi to join us. [So] we put him up for a while, and he worked for Joe enthusiastically." Odoi later inherited Terry's position at the Daily Nation newspaper as editorial cartoonist but he also continued working on other publications in collaboration with other Kenyan cartoonists such as Paul Kelemba, Gado, and Kham.

Amongst the publications they collaborated on were Sukumawiki (where Frank signed his work as "Frank Odoi, Sinker of Noah's Ark!"), Men Only, Pichadithi and African Illustrated. Frank also worked on educational books and comics and even spent three years as an illustrator at the International Centre For Insect Physiology and Ecology (ICIPE), a job he described as challenging: "Can you imagine an Artist working in the middle of all those Scientists!!! That was challenging, but I did it for three years! After all, someone has to do it."

Frank's work has also appeared in various international publications such as the Ugandan Monitor, New Vision of Uganda, Daily Graphic of Ghana, Noticias (Mozambique), Dejembe Dapanda (Denmark), Helsingin Sanomat (Finland) and the BBC's Focus on Africa magazine. He has also held exhibitions in East Africa, West Africa and Europe.

Sample of Frank Odoi's artwork

But perhaps the work Frank is most famous for is the Akokhan series. This comic series is about the centuries-long rivalry between Akokhan and his evil nemesis, Tonkazan. A fan of Western comic-book superheroes as a child, Frank wanted a superhero whose powers came from "unexplainable" sources unlike Western superheroes who "derived their powers from scientific... and thus easily explainable sources." So he created Akokhan, an African superhero based on African folklore whose power sources are unexplainable. "Call it magic, but when you breath life into fantasy, it stops being magic… bringing fantasy and African roots-religion together gave me Akokhan." The first book collection of Akokhan was published in Finnish in Finland in 2007 and an English version was launched in Nairobi by Kenway Publications.

Another of Frank's famous works is the Golgoti series which also appeared in newspapers in Ghana and East Africa. This series is about a white explorer who comes to Africa, but this time the story is narrated from the black man's perspective. Book versions of the Golgoti comic series have been published in Finland and England.

Frank Odoi was a member of World Comics Finland and chairperson of the East African association of Cartoonists (Katuni). He received the cartoonist of the year award in Kenya in 1985, 1986, and 2004 and the cartoonist of the year award in Ghana in 2005. He was a director of Four Dimension Innovative, a media company based in Nairobi, where he helped develop and launch the XYZ Show, a daring satirical puppet show similar to the British 1980's show Spitting Image and France's Les Guignols.

Frank died on 21 April 2012 when a matatu (public-transport mini-buses that ply the Kenyan roads) he was riding in veered off the road and crashed into a ditch, killing the cartoonist and another passenger.
