= UBC Television =

Ugandan television station

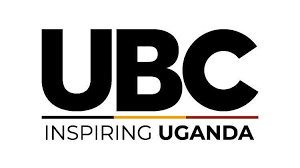
- Branding: UBC
- Country: Uganda
- Availability: National
- Founded: 8 October 1963; 62 years ago by Government of Uganda
- Motto: Inspiring Uganda
- Headquarters: Kampala, Uganda
- Parent: Uganda Broadcasting Corporation
- Launch date: December 6, 1963
- Picture format: 720p (HDTV)
- Official website: ubc.co.ug
- Language: English

UBC Television is the television channel of the state-owned Uganda Broadcasting Corporation. Founded in 1963 as Uganda Television (UTV), it merged with Radio Uganda in 2006, forming UBC. Historically, it had the widest reach among the terrestrial television networks of Uganda.

== History ==
Uganda Television started broadcasting in October 1963, a year after Uganda achieved its independence.

Much like the Uganda Broadcasting Service that came before, the station was built with European engineers. The station was initially housed at the Nakasero facilities, that were later demolished to make room for a Hilton hotel. Bob Astles was appointed head of the outside broadcast unit in 1963, a position he held until 1971 when Idi Amin took over the government. Amin wanted Astles to continue working for UTV, but was subsequently refused as Astles supported Obote and was subsequently jailed.

Idi Amin's rule oversaw massive changes to Uganda Television, which was his first target. UTV was already a propaganda tool for the Obote government, something that was heavily retooled under the new leader. Network head Aggrey Awori was beaten up and fled to Kenya; his deputee James Bwogi took his place. He demanded to reform the broadcaster with the aim of introducing current affairs programmes reflective of his plan to make UTV a medium of discussion. Thanks to his reorganisation, UTV started housing opinions from "an increasing number of people", often showing opinions that never pleased Amin. Subsequently, he was abducted and Amin reformulated UTV again. The main news lasted for one hour, in four languages, English, Swahili, French and Arabic, per a presidential decree, even though French and Arabic were never official languages in the country.

By the mid-1970s, it was broadcasting for six hours on weekdays (5pm to 11pm) and eight on weekends (3pm to 11pm) on a six-transmitter network.

In 1988, shortly after the fall of Idi Amin's regime, UTV broadcast testimonies of those who survived his massacres between 1983 and 1985, on Sunday evenings. Long excerpts of these hearings were carried out on local newspapers. The channel had exclusive rights to the 1998 FIFA World Cup, which was contested by Sanyu Television, Uganda's first private channel,

On 12 March 2001, Uganda Television started broadcasting to the Western Region for the first time in its history, with the establishment of a transmitter at Fort Portal (alongside Radio Uganda's Blue Network). A relay transmitter at Arua was at an "advanced stage" in May 2002. In 2004, Simwogerere Kyazze of The Monitor saw UTV as a "badly managed parastatal"

UTV was rebranded UBC Television after the merger took into effect on 19 April 2006 under the new corporate tagline "Bigger, Better" (UBC Television also used the tagline "Uganda's Preferred Network"). The Monitor believed that the rebrand, as well as the implementation of more advanced graphics, caused UBC to look like WBS Television, the most watched TV network in Uganda at the time, who had poached several personalities from UTV since launch. Edgar Tabaro delivered the opening speech of the new UBC Television. The channel was also made available on the JumpTV platform shortly after, aiming at the diaspora.

On 22 April 2006, UBC Television announced that it would relocate from Lubumba Lane in Nakasero to the existing radio facility at Nile Avenue, as two Sudanese brothers, working for AYA (U) Ltd., wanted to build a luxury five-star hotel in place of the former UTV headquarters. The relocation took place on 15 July, while its broadcasts were suspended at 8am that day.

By the late 2000s, 60% of Uganda received UBC, the widest compared to its private competitors.
