= Bettina Ng'weno =

Kenyan author and anthropologist

Bettina Ng'weno is a Kenyan author, anthropologist and associate professor of African American and African Studies at the University of California, Davis.

== Early life and education ==
Ng'weno was born in 1967 in Nairobi to Kenyan journalist Hilary Ng'weno and his wife, Fleur (née Grandjouan), a writer and natural historian. She is the second born of 2 children with her and her sister Amolo also joining the family academic and innovative career paths.

Ng'weno completed secondary school in Kenya before moving to the United States. She earned a Bachelor of Science in Agricultural Science and Management, at the University of California, Davis, followed by a Master of Arts in Anthropology from Stanford University and a PhD in Anthropology from Johns Hopkins University.

== Career ==
Ng'weno's research examines space, materiality, land, and their relations to people, drawing from her Nairobi upbringing and connections to the African diaspora. In 2022, she served as lead director of the Mellon Research Initiative "Reimagining the Indian Ocean World," investigating transnational connections across the Indian Ocean.

Her publications include Turf Wars (2007), Developing Global Leaders: Case Studies from Africa (2020), No Place Like Home in a New City (2025), Listening Like a State (2025), and contributions to Reimagining Indian Ocean Worlds (2020). These works address anti-urbanist policies in Africa and its diasporas.

In 2025, she participated in the Sharjah Biennial 16's "April Acts" weekend initiative , exploring the event's curatorial themes tied to its coastal location.

== Awards and recognition ==
Ng'weno has received the UC Davis Distinguished Graduate and Postdoctoral Mentorship Award (2020, 2025), Academic Senate Distinguished Teaching Award, ASUCD Excellence in Undergraduate Education Award, and a Wenner-Gren Foundation grant.
