= 2004 Réunionese Regional Council election =

French regional election in 2004

Regional Council elections were held in Réunion in 2004 as part of the French regional elections. The result was a victory for the Communist Party of Réunion–Free Dom alliance, which won 27 of the 45 seats.

== Results ==
| Party | First round | | Second round | | Seats | +/– |
| Party | Votes | % | Votes | % | Seats | +/– |
|---|---|---|---|---|---|---|
| PCR–Free Dom | 94,531 | 34.48 | 135,706 | 44.85 | 27 | – |
| Union for a Popular Movement | 70,375 | 25.67 | 99,315 | 32.82 | 11 | –6 |
| PS–Greens | 43,625 | 15.91 | 67,570 | 22.33 | 7 | – |
| Miscellaneous right (Nadia Ramassamy) | 16,625 | 6.06 | | | 0 | New |
| Miscellaneous right (Edmont Lauret) | 9,818 | 3.58 | | | 0 | New |
| Coll'Air | 5,849 | 2.13 | | | 0 | New |
| Miscellaneous left (Albert Ramassamy) | 4,784 | 1.74 | | | 0 | New |
| Free Dom dissidents | 4,761 | 1.74 | | | 0 | 0 |
| Lutte Ouvrière–MARON | 4,249 | 1.55 | | | 0 | 0 |
| Unemployed | 4,015 | 1.46 | | | 0 | New |
| Democratic European Force | 3,738 | 1.36 | | | 0 | New |
| Socialist Party dissidents | 2,402 | 0.88 | | | 0 | New |
| Nasion Rénioné | 1,925 | 0.70 | | | 0 | New |
| Independents | 7,465 | 2.72 | | | 0 | 0 |
| Total | 274,162 | 100.00 | 302,591 | 100.00 | 45 | 0 |
| Valid votes | 274,162 | 94.12 | 302,591 | 96.17 | | |
| Invalid/blank votes | 17,138 | 5.88 | 12,050 | 3.83 | | |
| Total votes | 291,300 | 100.00 | 314,641 | 100.00 | | |
| Registered voters/turnout | 463,654 | 62.83 | 463,676 | 67.86 | | |
Source: French Politics, La Réunion
