= One Africa Television =

Namibian free-to-air television station founded in 2003

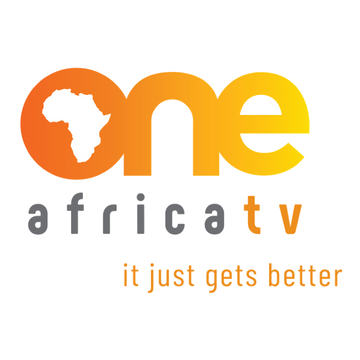
- Logo for One Africa Television
- Country: Namibia
- Broadcast area: Namibia
- Headquarters: Windhoek, Namibia

Programming
- Language: English
- Picture format: 1080i (16:9 HDTV)

History
- Launched: September 2002; 23 years ago
- Former names: TVAfrica Namibia (2002-2003)

Links
- Website: www.oneafrica.tv

One Africa Television is a Namibian free-to-air television station that was established in November 2003. It was founded by Paul van Schalkwyk in 2003, marking the country's inaugural private television network. The channel replaced the local affiliate of TVAfrica that entered a period of limbo after its parent company in South Africa was put into liquidation.

== History ==
The channel started broadcasting in September 2002 as TVAfrica Namibia, the Namibian affiliate station of the pan-African TVAfrica network from Johannesburg, which had been absent from Namibian screens for six months after facing problems with Desert TV (which eventually resumed operations in May that year picking up ABN). For this end, the South African network partnered with INTV, a local production company, to establish TVAfrica Namibia (Pty).

One year into its existence, TVAfrica fell into liquidation, and without its former strategic partner, had to prepare a new format. This became One Africa Television in November 2003, 51% was owned by management and staff and 49% by empowerment companies, part of which was coming from the Namibia Mineworkers Investment Holding Company (Nam-mic). With the relaunch, most of its programmes were drawn in from South African sources.

The channel's tone and appearance is younger on purpose compared to NBC, with music shows, a football analysis programme (Offside) and One Against Crime, a programme featuring a police officer, and sponsored by Kia. One episode shown in 2009 was against fake sellers of Korean cars, the ones of the show's sponsor.

In 2020, the TribeFire Studios Group acquired One Africa Television.

Paul van Schalkwyk, the founder and group chairman of One Africa Television, died in a plane crash on March 10, 2014.

== Programming ==
The channel presents various segments including:

- TodayOnOne (featuring community news and current affairs, broadcast daily)
- LearnOnOne (providing educational content for both school and adult audiences, offering extra classes and daytime TV, available at www.learnononbe.org)
- It's A Wrap (offering commentary on current affairs)
- The Tribe (showcasing local music)

Additionally, foreign programs like 7de Laan and BBC are also part of the broadcasting lineup.

The news operation as of 2009 was openly critical of the government, covering topics that were taboo on state television. The channel hired journalists who left NBC due to its possible affiliation with the South West Africa People's Organisation (SWAPO).

The channel also aired the Miss Namibia pageant in 2008, with representatives from all ethnic communities.

== Distribution ==
From launch to 2017, it broadcast on UHF channel 48 in Windhoek. Aligned with Namibia's Digital Terrestrial Television Policy, One Africa Television ceased analog transmission via antenna on October 20, 2017.
