= TV+ =

TV+ or TV plus may refer to:

- ABC TV Plus, an Australian television channel
- TV+ (Bulgaria), a Bulgarian television channel
- TV+ (Chile), formerly UCV, a Chilean free-to-air television channel
- TV Plus, a local television station in Kumanovo, North Macedonia
- ABS-CBN TV Plus, formerly Sky TV+, a Philippine digital terrestrial television provider
- Apple TV+, an over-the-top subscription video on-demand service
- E TV Plus, an Indian Telugu comedy entertainment channel
- TV+ (Gabon), a Gabonese television channel
- Samsung TV Plus, an over-the-top video service

== See also ==
- TV Puls, a Polish commercial television channel
