= Télé Free Dom =

Defunct television channel in Réunion, France

- Country: Réunion, France
- Headquarters: Saint-Denis, Réunion

Programming
- Language: French

Ownership
- Owner: Free Dom (Camille Sudre)

History
- Launched: 13 March 1986; 39 years ago
- Closed: 24 February 1991; 34 years ago

Télé Free Dom was a French overseas departmental television channel in the island of Réunion, which operate from the mid-1980s to the early 1990s. Founded by Camille Sudre, it was the TV sister outlet to Radio Free Dom. It closed following an intervention from CSA, but had its license legalized; however, a storm knocked off its transmitter before it could even resume transmissions.

== History ==
In 1985, Camille Sudre, owner of the successful independent radio station Radio Free Dom, brought the necessary equipment to establish a television station. On 13 March 1986, Télé Free Dom made its first broadcast, breaking the monopoly held by RFO since 1964. She presented her proposal to the authorities as part of a TDF plan to establish around forty local television stations across French departments, both in mainland France and overseas. The initial plan was for the channel to operate illegally for an unspecified period of time before gaining its own license.

By September 1986, some 10,000 viewers supported the station. That same month, four regional television projects were presented to CNCL: Télé Free Dom, Réunion Point Télévision, Télévision de Bourbon (TVB) and Réunion Télévision (RTV). In order to approve a license, CNCL had to review four criteria: the participation of competing companies in regional development, the guarantees offered in the field of information, the financial guarantees offered and, finally, the proposed technical guarantees. CNCL ended up cancelling the proposal.

TDF was not the only entity showing concern over the new channel. Opposition also came from video club owners as well as film production and distribution companies, as Télé Free Dom was broadcasting feature films illegally. By 1987, when Le Monde visited the station, although its standards of living were lower than in the mainland, Réunion had a high usage of video equipment (especially VCRs). Its programming, however, was seen as mediocre, with its original programming being of low quality, as well as barely-paid entertainment shows and pirated karate and pornographic films, all dependent on intermediaries from Paris. The pornographic movies were acquired "in package, in kilos". In 1987, the channel increased its airtime, running from 10am to midnight on working days and 24 hours a day on weekends and on school holidays. RFO's two channels, by contrast, only opened in the afternoon (averaging eight hours on RFO 1 and four on RFO 2). One of its measures to combat RFO was increasing the amount of local programming, which on its competitor was limited to the news. Debates were the most prominent, with formats such as Face à la presse, Télé Free-ctions and Télé Doléances (adapted from the radio format Radio Doléances). The move to localize its offer came precisely at a time when RFO was forced to start full production of its news and current affairs programs from Paris, which were later sent to the overseas departments and territories.

On May 30, 1989, CSA initiated a new licensing round for a private station. The bidders were Télé Free Dom, TVB, Télé Run, Télé Réunion and Antenne Réunion, which was coupled with Canal+ Réunion, an encrypted service. Antenne Réunion won the license on 2 March 1990, causing concern from Camille Sudre. The channel started organizing Télé Riposte as an act of protest against Antenne Réunion, which was going to occupy Télé Free Dom's existing UHF frequency (25). For twelve hours a day, protests and calls for its legalization were seen on the station. On 7 March, the protest had reached Saint-Denis, hoping for CSA to legalize the station. After these protests, discussions between CSA and Free Dom's leader failed. Camille Sudre announced that she would bid for a new television channel, Télé Liberté. CSA eventually established an ultimatum, where the station was set to go off air from 1 February 1991, in order to use the frequency for Antenne Réunion. A few hours later, the station resumed broadcasting on a new frequency (channel 28).

The reopening on channel 28 was met with opposition from Sudre, who announced that she would not take her channel off air. On 16 February, she announced a mass rally for the next week, which was already being planned by its radio sister station. Hundreds of CRS agents were supposed to enter the airport, but, in reality, only around 100 were involved, as the island's government did not have enough resources during the Gulf War. When the final attempt failed, the government suspended all protests, but on 23 February, Sudre set up an appeal against the decision. The following day, between 6 and 9am, CRS headed over to its transmitters at La Montagne, shutting down its broadcasts. The apprehension of the transmitting equipment initiated a series of violent acts, which included attacks against a Groupe Bourbon supermarket, as its owner, Jacques de Chateauvieux, was the founder of Antenne Réunion. The channel continued applying for a legal license, hoping to become the fourth television channel in Réunion.

A final round of licenses in June 1992 gave Télé Free Dom a possible chance of returning, putting the station against six other competitors: Antenne Réunion, TV4, Télé Arc-en-ciel, Télé Korail, Télé Océane, TV Sud and Sky Réunion. Of these seven, only five (Télé Free Dom, Antenne Réunion, TV4, TV Sud and Télé Océane) received preliminary licenses. Télé Free Dom later lost one of its transmitters to a cyclone and did not resume its plans to continue broadcasting, this time legally. The radio station continues operating. Out of all the channels approved in 1992, only Antenne Réunion continues on air.
