= 1998 Réunionese Regional Council election =

Regional Council elections were held in Réunion in 1998 as part of the French regional elections. The Communist Party of Réunion–Socialist Party–Miscellaneous left alliance emerged as the largest faction in the Council, winning 19 of the 45 seats.

== Results ==
Party	Votes	%	Seats	+/–
PCR–PS–DVG		31.94	19	+4
Union for French Democracy		15.04	9	–1
Rally for the Republic		14.21	8	0
Free Dom		10.02	5	–7
Miscellaneous right (Margie Sudre)		7.43	4	–
Miscellaneous right (Mac-Endré Hoarau)		2.47	0	–
Miscellaneous left (Alex Kichenin)		1.50	0	–
Free Dom dissidents		1.37	0	–
Lutte Ouvrière		1.27	0	–
Greens		1.10	0	–
Citizen and Republican Movement		1.00	0	–
National Front		0.84	0	–
Mouvman Parnouminm		0.77	0	–
Radical Party of the Left		0.43	0	–
Independents		10.60	0	–
Total			45	0
Source: French Politics
