= Television Malawi =

Television Malawi

Television Malawi (TVM), founded in 1999, is a public broadcaster run by the Malawi Broadcasting Corporation (MBC) in Blantyre, Malawi. The station transmits its signal throughout the country via satellite.

== History ==
The Malawi Congress Party government was against the introduction of television in Malawi. In 1996, the idea was first mooted following a change of political power to the United Democratic Front. The government appointed the Malawi Post and Telecommunications Corporation with assistance from Malaysian private channel TV3 and later the Malawi Development Corporation. Up until then, the only television services available in Malawi were delivered by satellite. It was initially suggested that the service was going to be on air by March 1997. Later, the prospective launch date was pushed ahead to November 1996. Equipment was provided by Sony and NEC. The station was set to broadcast on VHF band III.

Following a series of delays, Television Malawi opened on 1 April 1999, in time for that year's elections. Extensive coverage of the campaign was carried. Initially the station had limited reach in Lilongwe and Blantyre, for a mere few thousand viewers, with the long-term aim at extending its reach nationwide and attaining as much as 40,000 viewers. The launch also coincided with the passing earlier in the year of the new Communications Bill, that gave MBC editorial independence from the government. Since Malawi lacked a proper production house, it had to rely on programming from South Africa and Zimbabwe. From September 1999, the channel started broadcasting 24 hours on weekends. The daily local schedule ran from 6pm to 8:15pm, and was now reaching practically the entire country, apart from two districts in the north. TVM produced news, cultural programming, a children's programme, a women's programme, a legal rights programme (Know Your Rights) and Islamic and Christian religious programming. However, the public put TVM under pressure for the excessive broadcast of foreign content from the United States, South Africa, China and France, but still with the aim of increasing its local programming. Achieving national coverage was a challenge. At the time, very few people watched television and was plagued by financial and technical problems. Out of 55 weekly hours, only 10 were given to local programmes. To offset some of these problems, TVM planned the introduction of television licenses.

For its first anniversary, TVM hoped to reach out to the whole country by year-end 2000. In 2000, 80% of the programming consisted of relays from BET International, Worldnet and TVAfrica. The government was planning the introduction of a television license fee effective January 2001. At the time, the country had little more than 50,000 television sets, for 300,000 viewers. Only ten hours out of 55 per week were made in Malawi. In May 2002, it started carrying programmes from the African Broadcast Network.

On July 1, 2011, TVM and MBC merged. On February 19, 2013, Television Malawi started broadcasting on DStv channel 295.
