= Tich Mataz =

Zimbabwean disc jockey and businessman (born 1969)

Tichafa Augustine Matambanadzo
- Tichafa
- Born: Tichafa Augustine Matambanadzo; 1969 (age 56–57); Harare
- Other name: Tich Mataz
- Citizenship: Zimbabwean
- Television: Zimbabwe Television, SABC
- Awards: First Non-Athlete Reebok Ambassador

Tichafa Augustine Matambanadzo (Harare, 1969), better known as Tich Mataz, is a Zimbabwean disk jockey and businessman. Most of his business career was done at local radio stations, and also serves as a master of ceremonies for events.

== Biography ==
Mataz was born in 1969 when Zimbabwe was still Rhodesia. His broadcasting career began in 1988 at the Zimbabwe Broadcasting Corporation's station Radio 3 (now known as Power FM). In 1991, he made his first stint abroad for Bop Broadcasting of Bophuthatswana, a station with a similar profile to ZBC Radio 3. When he left Zimbabwe, his pay was of Z$2,000; upon entering South Africa, his pay was of R15,000. Following the fall of apartheid and the democratisation of South Africa, he moved to the SABC station Metro FM as a replacement for one of its long-serving announcers, Bob Mabhena. His arrival to the SABC was plagued by editorial limitations Radio Bop did not have. During the mid-1990s, he started accumulating wealth, becoming the first buyer of an off-roader in South Africa. When BMW became aware of the situation, the manufacturer offered Mataz its 4×4 model, the BMW X5, and became the first to drive it in Johannesburg. He was also Reebok South Africa's first non-athlete brand ambassador.

Still in South Africa, he started gaining fraudulent schemes and titles. His work permit at Bop Broadcasting was valid from 31 March 1994 to 31 March 1995; after that, he started to live illegally there. With the money he gained there, he held a trip to Jamaica where he visited the shrine dedicated to Bob Marley and even went to Prague when Michael Jackson's HIStory World Tour toured there. Not long before deportation, he was in Burkina Faso to cover the 1998 Africa Cup of Nations, and, back in South Africa, an edition of Woza Weekend on SABC 1 and work at 5FM.

On 24 March 1998, the South African authorities deported Tich Mataz after violating a prior commitment done a week before taking part on the SABC (the permit said that he had to comply with it by 18 March, but the Woza Weekend event took place after the deadline) and was forbidden from doing business while in South Africa. Upon returning to Zimbabwe, he faked his return visa and turned down his plans to work at ZBC TV because he failed to provide a paper with his academic qualifications he claimed to have gained abroad.

In October 2002, he took part in a cooking show (Taste of Africa) which first aired on the ill-fated, pan-African, Johannesburg-based TVAfrica network in October 2002.

By 2013, he was working on commercial radio station Star FM. In August of that year, he was accused of defrauding the company for US$126,000, claiming that the station did not have the capacity of producing certain programmes.

In July 2023, he opened a private TV station in Zimbabwe, NRTV. The station is owned by Rusununguko Nkululeko Holdings. Mataz acts as its representant.

On 1 August 2025, he held a throwback event in Gaborone, Take Us Back – 90s Edition.
