= Lesotho Television =

State television channel of Lesotho

Lesotho Television, known as (LNBS), is the state television channel of Lesotho and is operated by Lesotho National Broadcasting Services. The channel broadcasts in English and Sesotho languages.

== History ==
In the early 1970s, Lesotho only had television in two hotels as a closed-circuit system. By 1984, viewers could receive two SABC networks (TV1 and TV3) via spillover in most of the country, though this was only possible by using sophisticated antennas directed to Bloemfontein.

Lesotho Television was established in 1988 in an agreement with M-Net to provide a 15-minute service during the visit of Pope John Paul II to the country, during his papal trip to southern Africa in September of that year. The channel relied on M-Net's Open Time slot to broadcast the content, and was run under the budget and staff of Radio Lesotho. With the conclusion of the papal trip, the government continued its transmission and sought to convert it into a full-service television station, by means of a budget vote. The training facility was subsequently converted to a television studio.

Gradually, LTV's programming slot increased from 15 minutes to 30 minutes, later to one hour and subsequently two hours. This agreement to broadcast LTV during M-Net's Open Time slot lasted until 1998. Up until this period, the channel's coverage was limited to the towns of Teyateyaneng, Maputsoe, Hlotse, Mafeteng and Maseru.

In 1998, LTV digitised its equipment by accepting an offer from the Chinese government who supplied equipment from Dayang. Such equipment was quickly discarded and replaced by ones from Avid Technology. Digital broadcasts also started, thanks to its relation with M-Net, which enabled it to be carried nationwide on DStv. The launch was performed by the prime minister of the period, Pakalitha Mosisili. The launch of satellite broadcasts enabled Lesotho Television to broadcast for four hours a day, from 6pm to 10pm.

LTV's long-time agreement with M-Net ended on 1 April 2002 when it signed an agreement with TVAfrica, the ill-fated attempt at creating a pan-African television network. The channel's broadcasting hours increased, but the schedule wouldn't change until May 2002. The switch to TVAfrica coincided with the end of its relations with M-Net, which transferred its terrestrial transmitter network to the government, in order to reach a larger proportion of the country's population. The new schedule and the changes within also coincided with the then-upcoming 2002 Lesotho general election.

As of 2022, LTV broadcasts daily from 6am to 10:30pm, on both digital terrestrial television and satellite.

== Coverage ==
LTV broadcasts on DStv channel 292 and by a network of digital terrestrial transmitter sites. In July 2022, 11 of the 21 transmitters were functional, some lacked equipment, were off air or were vandalised. Analogue signals were supposed to be switched off by 31 March 2023.

== Programming ==
LTV broadcasts 75% of its content in Sesotho and 25% in English. The main news in Sesotho is broadcast at 7:30pm. LTV also obtains programming from foreign sources, namely Voice of America, the BBC, Al-Jazeera, CGTN (CCTV) and the members of the Southern African Broadcasting Association.
