= The Africa Channel International =

Former British network

The Africa Channel
- Country: United Kingdom
- Broadcast area: International
- Headquarters: London, England

Programming
- Picture format: 16:9 (576i, SDTV)

Ownership
- Owner: The Africa Channel Limited

History
- Launched: 3 September 2007; 19 years ago
- Closed: 29 September 2015; 11 years ago

Links
- Website: www.theafricachannel.co.uk

Availability (at time of closure)

Streaming media
- Virgin TV Anywhere: Watch live (UK only)

The Africa Channel was an international television channel based in the United Kingdom.

== History ==
The Africa Channel launched in the UK and Ireland on 3 September 2007 and is distinct from The Africa Channel in the United States, though initially it established contacts with James Makawa, founder of the original channel. It launched in nine million households in the UK and Ireland. In April 2012, The Africa Channel in the UK was made free-to-air and in July moved from the Lifestyle and Culture section of the Sky EPG to the Entertainment section. A one-hour timeshift channel briefly ran between 12–30 July 2012.

An Asian stream of the channel was launched on 16 August 2012. On 11 October 2012, The Africa Channel launched on the Virgin Media cable TV platform. On 29 September 2015, The Africa Channel closed in the UK after being removed and restored several times during Summer 2015.

== Programming ==
The Africa Channel sources much of its content from production companies in Africa. The channel broadcasts a range of genres including lifestyle, live news, travel, music, documentaries (e.g. Cuba, an African Odyssey and Surfing Soweto) and films (e.g. Daratt, Imani and Rachida). In 2012 the channel began developing its own production arm to generate programming focussed on Africa-related subject matter including a documentary about the Pan-African bank Ecobank first broadcast in December 2012.

Programming is sourced from various countries, and includes a Kenyan talk show, The Patricia Show, and Nigerian and South African soap dramas Tinsel and Scandal!. All programming is focused on Africa and the diaspora, and the channel is aimed at people with an interest in the continent.

The channel broadcast the British sitcom Meet the Adebanjos whose characters are British Nigerians living in Peckham, South London.

On 14 January 2013, The Africa Channel relaunched Desmond's - the popular British situation comedy that centred on Desmond’s bustling barber shop in Peckham, and featured a predominantly Black British cast. The series was originally broadcast between 1989 and 1994 and alongside The Fosters, is well known as one of the first British television programmes to focus on the lives of Black British, Caribbean and African people living in Britain.

== See also ==
- The Africa Channel
