= STV (Kenyan TV channel) =

- Country: Kenya
- Broadcast area: Kenya

Programming
- Languages: English; Swahili

History
- Launched: 9 August 1996; 30 years ago

STV, formerly known as Stellavision, was a Kenyan free-to-air television network that was launched in the mid-1990s by Hilary Ng'weno. In its early years, it partnered with Sky News, then it became an affiliate of TVAfrica throughout all of its existence.

== History ==
Stellavision was licensed on 13 July 1990, was announced in July 1996 and started broadcasting on 9 August 1996. The channel's parent company was Stellagraphic, also owned by Ng'weno. Initially it relayed Sky News overnight, mornings and parts of the afternoon, while the bulk of its entertainment schedule consisted of a mix of imports (Kideo, Days of Our Lives, etc.) The Sky News relays were possible as it was its partner channel in Kenya.

In July 1998, the station became a charter affiliate of the South African-Mauritian company Direct-to-Broadcaster Programming (later renamed African Broadcasting Network and subsequently TVAfrica. On 7 January 1999, it signed a memorandum of understanding with ABN in which the Mauritian company would acquire 26% of the shares, with Ng'weno's Stellagraphics keeping the remaining 74%. The agreement came following the termination of a prior arrangement with Media Plus Sports Limited the previous month. In May, Ng'weno folded his business newspaper The Weekly Review after 24 years under financial unviabilities, causing him to concentrate on STV instead. In October, Alex Kobia became STV's manager and planned a nationwide expansion. Initially limited to Nairobi, TVAfrica expanded its reach to include Mombasa and Kisumu near the end of the year, then in early 2000 to Nkuru, Eldoret and Central Province. By this time, TVAfrica owned 40% of STV. The expansion plan was complete by April 2000 with the introduction of a seventh transmitter at Nakuru. During the September 11 attacks, it briefly resumed retransmission of Sky News.

In April 2002, STV, at the time the East African arm of TVAfrica, acquired CTV in Uganda and closed its offices at Jinja Road in Kampala. Subsequently, Kobia, who was formerly TVA's Kenyan manager, became in charge for coordinating the network in the greater region.

On 1 October 2003, TVAfrica was put up for liquidation and ceased transmission. STV/Stellavision continued broadcasting independently after that, and by early 2007, the Sky News relays were replaced by Voice of America; complemented by relays of Al-Jazeera English, becoming the second Kenyan channel to do so after NTV. As of mid-May that year, opposition leader Uhuru Kenyatta acquired Stellavision Kenyatta's associates also founded K24 TV in 2007 (broadcasts started in 2008); STV continued operational for longer (as late as 2010); it is unclear when or if STV shut down.
