= Gordon Wavamunno =

Ugandan businessman

- Born: 16 December 1943 (age 82); Rugaaga, Isingiro District; Uganda
- Citizenship: Uganda
- Occupations: Businessman, entrepreneur, philanthropist
- Years active: Since 1966
- Known for: Wealth, Philanthropy, Mercedes Benz Sole distributor
- Title: Prof. Sir

Gordon Wavamunno (born 16 December 1943), is a Ugandan entrepreneur, businessman, and philanthropist. He is the owner of Spear Motors Uganda—the sole distributor of Mercedes-Benz vehicles in Uganda. He also owns other companies like GM Tumpeco which makes Ugandan Vehicle number plates, Wavah Water Limited and Wavah Books Limited. He was the director for WBS Television and is reported to be one of the wealthiest people in Uganda. He also served as the honorary consul of Hungary to Uganda.

== Early life and education ==
Wavamunno was born on 16 December 1943 in Rugaaga, (modern-day Isingiro District) Western Region of Uganda. Following early public education in his home area, he moved to Mbarara, the largest town in the sub-region, when he was a teenager. He later relocated to Kampala, Uganda's capital and largest city.

== Career ==
Wavamunno's parents owned a retail shop and he helped in running it as a young boy. When he moved to Mbarara as a teenager, he worked as a shop assistant in a produce store owned by an Asian family. Later, he began to purchase farm produce from the nearby villages. He would then sell the produce to the Asian shops and families in Mbarara. When he acquired his first automobile, he began a special hire taxi service in the town. He later expanded this business to include a driving school. In his mid-20s, he relocated to Kampala and worked as a driver/tour guide for a tour operator called Equatorial Agencies Ltd., from 1967 to 1972. Wavamunno took over Spear Tours and Travel when its owner Ashok Patel was murdered by dictator Idi Amin's soldiers.

In 1973, one year after the expulsion of Ugandan Asians by Amin, Wavamunno leveraged his assets and started Spear Motors Limited, the sole Mercedes-Benz dealership in Uganda. The dealership is also the sole authorised dealer in Jeep, Dodge, and Chrysler automobiles and parts. In addition, Spear Motors is the sole distributor of Deutz Fahr tractors and farm machinery in Uganda. Deutz Fahr is a farm equipment manufacturer based in Treviglio, northern Italy.

== Investments ==
As of September 2013, the following were some of the enterprises owned wholly or in part by Wavamunno. The businesses listed here are sometimes referred to as the Spear Group of Companies or simply the Spear Group.

- Spear Motors Limited – Franchise distributor and dealer in Mercedes Benz, Jeep, Dodge, Chrysler, Fiat and Deutz Fahr brands in Uganda.
- Wavah FM – A private radio station.
- Star Times Digital Satellite Television Service – A digital satellite distributor of television signals in Uganda.
- Spear House – An office building on Jinja Road in Kampala's central business district.
- Wavah Water Limited – A manufacturer and distributor of drinking mineral water in Uganda.
- GM Tumpeco Limited – A manufacturer and fabricator of steel products, including number plates, traffic road signs, and billboards. Also, furniture, spring mattresses, uniports, wheelbarrows, and truck and bus bodies.
- Fancy Furniture Limited – Importer and distributor of high-end office and household furniture.
- Wavah Books Limited – A publisher of school text books and other writings.
- Nakweero Mixed Farm – A diary, beef, and crop farm in Nakweero, Kira Municipality, Wakiso District.

== Other responsibilities ==
Wavamunno has an honorary doctorate degree from Makerere University, Uganda's oldest institution of higher learning, and from Nkumba University. He is a professor in business and entrepreneurship at Makerere University and is the chancellor at Nkumba University.

== Awards ==
In January 2013, Wavamunno was appointed Knight of the Order of Saint John. Recipients of knighthoods in this order are not normally entitled to the honorific of "Sir". The award was in recognition of his philanthropic work with St. John Association of Uganda, where he has been a member since 1983. He currently serves as the chairman of the association.

== Charitable works ==
Among other charitable acts, he has donated two ambulances to the association, renovated their offices in Kampala, and offered bursaries to orphans.

== Personal life ==
Wavamunno is married and is the father of both male and female children, including fashion model Gloria.

== See also ==
- Harvard Business School Interview - Creating Emerging Markets
