= Radio Télévision Ténéré =

Television station in Niger

Radio Télévision Ténéré is a privately owned Nigerien radio and television station, based in the national capital Niamey. It was the second private television station in Niger, after Télé-Star, which relayed TV5 Afrique.

== History ==
RTT was the first private radio station in Niger, having begun its broadcasts in 1993.

RTT started television broadcasting on 22 May 2000 in experimental form, relaying TVAfrica's French service and MCM Africa; the agreement both parties provided RTT with a daily five-hour schedule, consisting of music variety, action movies, sports and music videos. The first major sporting event carried by the new station was UEFA Euro 2000 from TVAfrica. Four months after launching, regular broadcasts began, then in February 2001, it started including large-scale local productions. The station employed the PAL standard for production and broadcasting.

Around 2002–2003, the station started receiving assistance from Télévision Suisse Romande for training journalists and was pending technical donations from Canal+ and DW-TransTel.

In May 2005, the police confiscated an RTT tape featuring footage of a protest. The apprehension took place in Zinder and was ordered by the city's governor, Abba Mallam Boukar.

On 17 September 2020, RTT was one of the five stations that signed a contract with Studio Kalangou to broadcast its hour-long forums from 1 October that year.
