= African Barter Company =

Pan-African barter syndication company

The African Barter Company (ABC) was a pan-African barter syndication company (the first of its kind) that distributed content to television stations in English and French-speaking countries in Sub-Saharan Africa. One of its founders was Zimbabwe-born James Makawa, who later founded the African Broadcast Network, a similar company, and The Africa Channel in the United States.

== History ==
The African Barter Company was established in 1995 by James Makawa, who after working in the United States after a four-year career with NBC and a brief stint in television syndication, decided to return to Africa, setting up ABC in Johannesburg. ABN's goal was to offer programming from the Western world to African television stations, at a time where stations struggled to buy "quality" programming, and signed an agreement with Gray Advertising. The programming, sourced primarily from US distributors and producers, was paid in dollars, which was expensive. ABC secured agreements with the producers and exchanged them for airtime.

At the 1996 MIPCOM, M-Net secured an agreement with the African Barter Company to distribute Egoli in association with US distributor Media Ventures International.

ABC reached 23 countries: Senegal, Mali, Guinea-Bissau, Guinea, Sierra Leone, Burkina Faso, the Ivory Coast, Ghana, Togo, Benin, Nigeria, Cameroon, Gabon, Ethiopia, Kenya, Tanzania, Uganda, Seychelles, Zambia, Zimbabwe, Namibia, South Africa and Mauritius.

In 2000, Makawa created the African Broadcast Network, making ABC its subsidiary. Around 2003, the company was defunct.

== See also ==
- TVAfrica, a similar network which unlike ABC, was structured like a channel
