= Independent Television and Radio =

Indepdendent Television and Radio
- Country: Nigeria
- Broadcast area: Ondo
- Headquarters: Benin

Ownership
- Owner: Independent Radio & Television (IBW Enterprises (Nig) Ltd.)

History
- Launched: 27 March 1997; 29 years ago

Links
- Website: www.itvradio.ng

Independent Television and Radio is a privately-owned radio and television station based in Benin, the capital of Edo State, with an additional station in Abuja. It was founded in 1997 by Gabriel Igbinedion. Its slogan is "Certainly the Best". The station is owned by IBW Enterprises.

== History ==
Igbinedion received a private television licence on 26 June 1993; ITV started broadcasting on 27 March 1997, on UHF channel 22, using a ten kilowatt transmitter. Subsequently Igbinedion received a second licence to transmit ITV's signal into on UHF channel 42 on 17 December 1999.

Independent Radio, its radio sister station, started broadcasting on 10 September 1998 on 92.3 FM; the station was best known for its nickname "The Heartbeat Station". The station was formally inaugurated on 7 November 1998 by the Oba of Benin, Omo ‘N’ Oba Nedo, Uku Akpolokpolo Oba Erediawa. ITV Abuja started broadcasting on 1 September 2007; a digital satellite licence was obtained in December 2009.

ITV was one of the Nigerian affiliates of the now-defunct TVAfrica network.

Beginning in 2022, the channel held an annual lecture; the second edition was held in April 2023 (Nigeria 2023: Quo Vadis?).
