= Sanyu Television =

Defunct Ugandan television channel

Sanyu Television was a Ugandan private television station founded in the early 1990s by the Katto family. One of the first private channels in existence there, it was later sold to Direct-to-Broadcast, a South African company which subsequently rebranded itself as TVAfrica, became its charter affiliate for Uganda and subsequently shut down alongside the network in 2003.

== History ==
Sanyu Television started broadcasting in October 1994. The channel provided an alternative to UTV and CTV; by 1996, it carried popular US TV series such as Hangin' with Mr. Cooper, The Fresh Prince of Bel Air, Living Single, The Commish and Dark Justice. It had a contract with CNN International to relay its programmes. Such contract ended in early 1998 and was replaced by Multichoice's music channel, Channel O, through a long-term agreement where the channel did not pay from it. Under the Katto family, it was owned by the Sanyu Group of Companies and broadcast from Naguru Hill. In June 1998, it had entered into a dispute with Uganda Television for the broadcast rights of the 1998 FIFA World Cup.

The Kattos later sold Sanyu TV to Direct to Broadcast, a South African-based company that delivered a package of programmes via satellite from Johannesburg and later sent it to TV stations across Africa via contracts. By doing so, it became one of the four founding affiliates. Subsequently, the Sanyu Group of Companies sold the channel to TVAfrica, effectively becoming an owned-and-operated station of the network, at the cost of US$5.5 million. The station changed its logo in 2000 to a modified version of TVAfrica's dotted map of Africa, bearing the STV initials.

For the rest of its existence, it served as the Uganda subsidiary of the TVAfrica network. It is believed that Sanyu Television shut down alongside TVAfrica in 2003, when the South African parent was put into liquidation. Thomas Katto, founder and former owner of the channel, died on 21 October 2007.
