= Desert TV =

Desert TV, also known as Desert Entertainment Television (Destv) was a Namibian television station. It broadcast in English and, later, also some Afrikaans content. It was founded in 2001 and closed at an unknown date.

== History ==
Desert TV started broadcasting in mid-2001. A conflict was underway with NBC director Uaziuva Kaumbi and its administration involving a potential partnership between the two companies. Desert TV was a TVAfrica affiliate for approximately one year, where it held 55% of the shares. It left the network in March 2002 because the South African network wanted "excessive shares of their revenues", causing the station to go off air. Broadcasts resumed on 15 May, in an agreement that also included the airing of the African Broadcast Network (with which it became an investor), followed by overnight and morning simulcasts of Deutsche Welle's TV channel and a five-hour block of music videos in the afternoon. Regular Desert TV programming aired between 6pm and 10pm, consisting of the ABN output as well as syndicated South African programmes in Afrikaans. Its staff was limited to three full-time employees, which it planned to increase at a later date when local programmes would be produced for the channel. From 2003, the channel would employ journalists to produce a local news service. During 2002, it moved from Kenya House in Robert Mugabe Avenue to Kasch Street.

The channel suspended its operations again on 3 January 2003 after technical problems hit the satellite system the network used. It had been running Channel O non-stop for two days (25 and 26 December 2002), but one week later, the station reportedly lost the location of the satellite, hampering its operations, and hired Satcom technicians to resolve the issue. In order to improve its reception in Windhoek, it planned to move to Independence Arena during 2003, which would also enable it to broadcast "live sports and other events".

It is unknown when the station shut down and if the move to the Independence Arena took place.
