= Terry Hirst =

- Born: Terry Hirst; 2 November 1932 Brighton, England
- Died: 26 June 2015 (aged 82)
- Area: Cartoonist
- Notable works: Joe, Pichadithi

Terry Hirst (1932–2015) was a British-Kenyan cartoonist and one of the leading figures in Africa's post-independence "golden age" of art and scholarship from the mid-1960s to the early 1980s which saw a flowering of work in the arts, cinema and the academic world. Born in Brighton, England, Hirst moved to Kenya in 1965 and spent the rest of his life there.

== Life and early career ==
Terry Hirst grew up in Brighton in southern England. From an early age Hirst knew that he wanted to be an artist. He drew constantly, and on his morning paper round he read the cartoons in every paper. From the 1940s to 1950, Hirst's thoughts and attitudes were strongly shaped by political cartoonists from across the political spectrum, including Low, Zec, Shepard, Illingworth, Lancaster, Cummings, Giles and Vicky. But it never occurred to him to be a cartoonist. He wanted to be an artist.
To the disappointment of his headmaster, Hirst turned down the opportunity to go to Oxford University and chose instead to take up a Fine Art course at the Brighton College of Art. After he graduated he was soon appointed the Head of the Art Department at one of the largest comprehensive schools in Nottingham.
While teaching in Nottingham, Hirst stumbled upon a newspaper advertisement for art teachers willing to teach in Africa. The choice was between Ghana and Kenya. Fueled by a sense of adventure, Hirst left England in 1965 to assume a teaching position at The Kenya High School in Nairobi. Part of the reason he took up the position in Kenya, Hirst says, was because of a returning settler who had told him about what a "terrible time" he had had in Kenya. He had given Hirst a copy of Jomo Kenyatta's Facing Mount Kenya to show him what he had been through, but when Hirst read the book he says it "blew my mind...! It was about, not ways of having but ways of being and I couldn't even tell him that I loved it!"
Hirst's decision to go to Kenya rather than Ghana was also influenced by the fact that the Kenyan contract was for two years while the Ghanaian contract stipulated a five-year commitment. To Hirst, five years sounded like it was too long.

== Hirst as an Educator ==
At Kenya High School Hirst quickly proceeded to design a new art room, and with Peter Kareithi, the Inspector of Art at the Ministry of Education, he helped to develop "a new model of creative education." Kenya needed a cadre of professionally trained art teachers for its expanding secondary schools and the five-year British model seemed like a "farce" in such a situation. Hirst helped introduce a two year course with an emphasis on teaching learners the essentials on materials, concepts and technique.
Hirst was also a part-time lecturer at the University of Nairobi and working with Gregory Maloba, one of the few fully trained artists in Kenya at the time, he spearheaded the introduction of a three-year B.Ed Art Course. The new system proved to be a success with the first generation of students to graduate producing outstanding work that was featured in the internationally distributed African Arts magazine.
In 1966, Hirst was "invited," as he puts it, by the Kenyan government to head art teacher-training at the Kenyatta University College. There, again with Maloba, he helped establish the Fine Art Department. (Note: Hirst however notes that the new art teacher training course he introduced at Kenyatta College was bitterly criticized by Sam Ntiro at Makerere and even Hirst's erstwhile ally Maloba at Nairobi University. They thought the new course had departed too radically from the British art school model that they had enjoyed and favoured and which Hirst describes as a "farce... training people to be artists, and then expecting them only to teach, whether they have a vocation or not." Hirst's course was quickly abandoned after he left. (See reference 3 below).) Besides his teaching work, Hirst was also active in other areas of the art scene. He became a founding member of the Paa Ya Paa Art Gallery where he met with "some of the most creative minds of the ‘independence’ generation." He eventually contributed two one-man exhibitions of paintings at the Paa Ya Paa Gallery which both sold out.

== The "Joe" Years ==
Hirst had already started to draw as a freelance cartoonist for the Daily Nation newspaper when Hillary Ng’weno invited him to illustrate his regular Monday satirical column "With a Light Touch." In 1973, two years after he started his collaboration with Ng'weno, the idea for a satirical magazine based on one of the characters in Ng'weno's column was born.
Hirst and Ng'weno envisioned Joe as a magazine that would feature illustrated jokes, comic strips and short stories by local writers. The character, Joe, Hirst explains, is "a survivor who has to laugh to keep from crying." The purpose of the magazine itself "was to comment on the news and to socialise people into being urban... to build a multiplicity of relationships... friendly but not involved emotionally."
To help make Joe a reality, Jonathan Kariara of Oxford University Press gave Hirst and Ng'weno "a room, a table and two chairs" so they could start work on the magazine. When the first edition of Joe came out in 1973 it was an immediate success, and the magazine quickly built its circulation at home and abroad.
After a year, however, Ng’weno left to start the "Weekly Review," a political commentary magazine. Joe meanwhile continued to grow more successful thanks to the popularity of comic strips such as Edward Gitau's "City Life" and Hirst's "The Good, The Bad, And The Ugali." Short stories by writers like David Maillu, Meja Mwangi, Leonard Kibera and even Ngũgĩ wa Thiong'o, who were well known in Kenya, also contributed to the popularity of the magazine.
At its peak, Joe's circulation reached 30,000 with copies going out as far as West Africa. And that was how, one morning, while working at the Joe offices, Hirst looked up to see a young Frank Odoi, freshly arrived from Ghana, beaming down at him with the words, "I'm here. I have come from Ghana to join you."
Hirst and his wife, Nereas N'gendo (who left Oxford University Press to work at Joe), were to run the magazine for the next ten years. Besides his work at Joe, Hirst was also doing editorial cartoons for the Daily Nation including the popular Hirst on Friday and Hirst on Sunday cartoons.
Despite growing political repression, Hirst considers those years to be among the happiest, creatively, of his life. He felt independent and free, able to do what he wanted "from inner necessity" rather than financial necessity and he felt able to "draw and comment upon anything, and encourage others to do the same." Unfortunately, given the increasingly hostile political climate in Kenya, the halcyon days couldn't last.

== The "Pichadithi" Years ==
In 1982, a group of soldiers attempted a coup d’état against the President, Daniel arap Moi. In the wake of the coup attempt, the environment for the media became very repressive. Joe closed its doors, Hirst was forced out of his job as an editorial cartoonist at the Daily Nation and his appointment as a lecturer at Kenyatta University College was not renewed. He fell into a deep depression.

Sample of Terry Hirst's artwork.

Forced to face the "usual artist's problem of how to make a living," Hirst decided to awaken an old dream. It had always been his ambition to create a local comic book industry. Hirst was able to persuade a leading local publisher, Kul Bakhou, that an unexplored market existed and that it would be mutually beneficial to explore this market. The result was a children's comic-book series called Pichadithi which was a re-telling of African folk-tales ("hadithi" in Kiswahili). Kul's company, Kul Graphics, agreed to pay Hirst up-front on receiving completed, camera-ready artwork monthly, thus financing the completion of the next month’s issue. Hirst was originally contracted by Kul to do the first ten titles, which Hirst hoped would be enough to get him back on his feet, and it was.
The Pichadithi series grew to be very popular with a monthly circulation of over 20,000 copies. Popular titles included Kenyatta's Prophecy, The Greedy Hyena, Wanjiru the Sacrifice, The Amazing Abu Nuwasi, Lwanda Magere, The Ogre’s Daughter, The Wisdom of Koomenjoe, Terror in Ngachi Village, and Simbi the Hunchback.
Hirst's idea with the series was to stimulate the creation of a comic book industry in which the graphic artists had full creative control over their work while receiving adequate payment and retaining the copyright to their own work. After Hirst did the first ten titles, other artists like Frank Odoi and Paul Kelemba contributed more titles. But then, according to Hirst, the "marketers" took over, looking for cheaper artists, dictating editorially, and relaxing the graphic art quality standards, "and the series went down-hill."

== A New Market For Comics ==
After leaving Pichadithi, Hirst discovered a new market in the field of "development communications." Hirst would receive commissions from government ministries, institutes, NGOs and other donors, for artwork for pamphlets, posters, comics, and documentary comic books, in subjects ranging from soil conservation and tree planting, to immunization, child health, sustainable development and zero-grazing.
Titles that Hirst worked on include The Kenya Pocket Directory of Trees and Shrubs (a "bestseller" for Kengo), Agroforestry for Dryland Africa for ICRAF, and The Struggle for Nairobi, which is the story of the creation of an urban environment from scratch. Other titles include Where the Future Begins! a comic for girls later published in 11 African countries, Human and Peoples' Rights, a widely distributed documentary comic during the UN’s Decade for Human Rights Education 1995-2005, and Introducing the Constitution of Kenya, a comic book published in 1998 as part of a long-running campaign on constitutional reform in Kenya which continued with posters, wall charts and pamphlets. These titles were often distributed free of charge to primary and secondary schools, colleges and universities in Kenya, East Africa and Africa.
One of Hirst's more notable achievements in the field of "development communications" was a 54-page documentary comic book called There is a Better Way which is based on the ideas of the economist Amartya Sen as embodied in his book Development as Freedom. Sen endorsed the comic book "with warm regards and great appreciation." The book was targeted at university-level students in East Africa, but Hirst adds that "they could not get enough copies in Cambridge or Harvard."
Hirst did not draw anything from 2003, when his studio was accidentally flooded, destroying many valuable canvases. In his last years, he spent much of his time in his library reading and writing.
