= The Africa Channel =

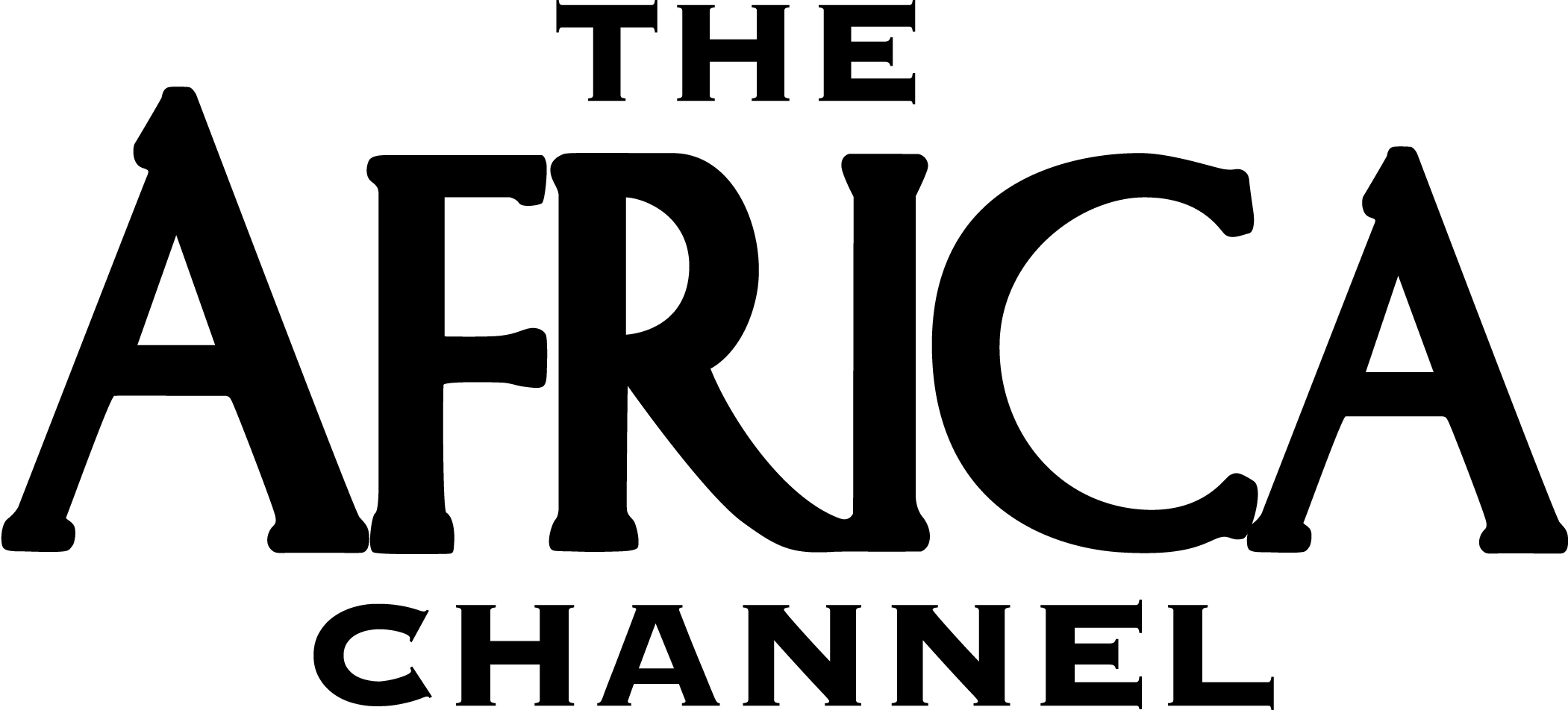
- Country: United States
- Broadcast area: United States, Caribbean, Canada
- Headquarters: North Hollywood, California

Programming
- Picture format: 480i (SDTV) 1080i (HDTV)

Ownership
- Owner: The Africa Channel, LLC

History
- Launched: September 1, 2005 (21 years ago)

Links
- Website: theafricachannel.com

The Africa Channel is a linear cable and online streaming channel focusing on travel, lifestyle, and cultural documentaries. The channel covers the lands, people, culture, and history of Africa. Co-founded by Zimbabwean James Makawa, who had prior experience in the United States and founded the African Barter Company, the Africa Channel launched in the United States in September 2005.

The Africa Channel is broadcast in the United States through Comcast, Charter Communications, along Cox Communications and also available in Jamaica, Bahamas, Trinidad & Tobago, St. Lucia, Barbados, Grenada and other Island countries throughout the Caribbean.

The channel launched in high definition on August 1, 2010.

The Africa Channel is an associate member of the Caribbean Cable Cooperative and is distinct from the international version of The Africa Channel which launched in September 2007. The African Channel is a showcase for English-language television series, specials, documentaries, feature films, music, soap operas, biographies, latest business analysis, cultural and historical programs.

In 2017, The Africa Channel launched its streaming service, dubbed "Demand Africa".

In 2019, Canadian households expand the channel.

== History ==
Makawa moved to Los Angeles in 2001 and it was there that the idea of The Africa Channel began to cement itself, drawn by his experience working in over 20 African countries, where he discovered African content that wasn't sold to. To this end, he began negotiations with established African broadcasters to license their productions. Not long after launch, the channel still lacked widespread availability and did not change the perception in which most Black Americans had of Africa, which was what Makawa intended.

== Programming ==
- Africa on a Plate, follow a chef as he tours Africa's cuisines
- African Masters, about the arts
- House of Tayo, about a Rwandan fashion designer
- Jabu's Jungle

== See also ==
- The Africa Channel International
