= Ondo State Radiovision Corporation =

- Country: Nigeria
- Broadcast area: Ondo
- Headquarters: Akure

Ownership
- Owner: Ondo State Government

History
- Launched: 1998; 28 years ago

Links
- Website: www.osrc.ng

The Ondo State Radiovision Corporation (OSRC) is a Nigerian radio and television company of the government of Ondo State.

Its origins are traced back to 1976, when Ondo was created from the division of the former Western State. Following this, the former Western Nigeria Television (NTA Ibadan) and Western Nigeria Broadcasting Service was replaced by three independent corporations for the new states, OGBC, OSRC and BCOS. An edict establishing OSRC was passed in July 1976, with its staff coming in from WNTV/WNBS.

In June 1982, Ondo State Television began operations. Its main station is on channel 23, with translators on channels 25 and 27. The television transmitter was transferred to Orita-Obele in November 1983. OSRC operated one radio station on the AM band and one television station during this period. The TV and radio operations merged in 1985, bringing them both under the OSRC umbrella as a cost-cutting measure. However, in May 1996, OSRC was divided into separate corporations again, the Ondo State Radio Corporation (ODRC) and Ondo State Television (ODTV). In order to boost its reception, ODRC installed a new digital 50 kW transmitter to boost its reception inside and outside Ondo.

OSRC was one of the Nigerian affiliates of the now-defunct TVAfrica network.

The existing OSRC board was dissolved on 18 December 2024. Kenneth Odusola-Stevenson became its new director-general.
