= ABC Television-Africa =

ABC Television-Africa was the first private independent terrestrial broadcaster in Sierra Leone, launched by President Alhaji Ahmad Tejan Kabbah, President of the Republic of Sierra Leone and Vice President of Sierra Leone Solomon Berewa on 24 March 2005. It ceased operations within 2 years after failing to be profitable. ABC was based in the United Kingdom.

== History ==
The station was founded, designed and constructed by Sierra Leonean Allieu M. Shaw. The station broadcasts on UHF. The Western Area including the capital Freetown, Port Loko, Kambia, Lunsar and some areas of Makeni are covered by the broadcast signals, with plans to increase coverage. The station broadcast news and entertainment programs, cultural and education programs, sports and youth programs, health, movies, drama, religion, and live broadcasts. The station employed over thirty personnel.

Initially, it was set to begin operations in October 2003 and would join TVAfrica as its affiliate, but the plans were halted when TVAfrica announced its liquidation. Network director Allieu Shaw had to travel to other countries to establish new contacts and was testing its facilities by late August 2004.

Broadcasts started on 24 March 2005.
