= Minaj Broadcast International =

Defunct Nigerian television channel

Minaj Broadcast International (MBI) was one of the first private television stations in Nigeria. The station was based in Obosi, Anambra State and was owned by the Minaj Group. It closed during the 2000s.

== History ==
MBI was founded by Mike Ajegbo in Obosi, launching as the first large independent television station outside of the Lagos-Ibadan axis of southwestern Nigeria. Subsequently, it opened a second office in Lagos in order to widen its reach. During its early years, MBI was plagued by technical and financial problems.

It began test transmissions in June 1994 as Minaj Systems Television (MST) to study its potential audience and started regular service on 1 December that year on UHF channel 43, covering Anambra State, as well as parts of Enugu, Edo, Kogi, Imo and Abia via signal overspill. In the mid-1990s, MST had four news bulletins, Dateline MST at 6:30am, a news bulletin in local vernacular at 7pm, an English bulletin at 7:30pm and a relay of the NTA Network News at 9pm. By 2001, MST started a 24-hour operation, up until then, it only broadcast for eighteen hours. In late 1997, the channel started satellite distribution, becoming MBI. Full satellite broadcasts began in early 1998.

The group started broadcasting a feed outside of Africa, MBI-Europe, in the last quarter of 1999. MBI Europe and MBI Africa were reported to be off air on PAS-3R on 7 July 2000, which affected MBI-Europe's coverage. It resumed service in February 2001. By 2001, it had transmitters in Lagos, Abuja and Enugu. Outside of these cities, it had agreements with local television stations to downlink its signal. There were also plans to launch it in the Americas.

During the early 2000s, it received programmes from the BBC, CNN International and TVAfrica (the last of which, as an affiliate), which were downlinked via satellite. By 2004, MBI was short-staffed, continuity announcers were replaced by scrolling text messages and the staff was working more for the packaging of MBI's programming. MBI broadcast from 5:30am to midnight except for Sundays, with a break from 2pm to 3:30pm. The Minaj station in Obosi frequently opened after 3pm, without airing the morning period. The local station had withdrawn the NTA Network News but was still obliged to air Government House activities per arrangements with the governments of Delta and Edo State. The Nigerian Broadcasting Commission was critical of MBI's political bias in its news operation.

It is unknown when exactly did MBI shut down.
