= Africa Online =

Kenya-based internet service provider

Africa Online Holding Ltd., sometimes abbreviated to AFOL, is the largest Internet service provider (ISP) in Africa. Based in Nairobi, Kenya, it offers Internet access and operates in ten African countries, including Côte d'Ivoire, Ghana, Namibia, Eswatini, Tanzania, Uganda and Zimbabwe. Services provided by Africa Online include dial-up Internet access, leased line services, e-mail accounts, VSAT connectivity, DSL, WAN and VPN for private and business customers. In 2007 it has become a subsidiary of Telkom South Africa.

== History ==
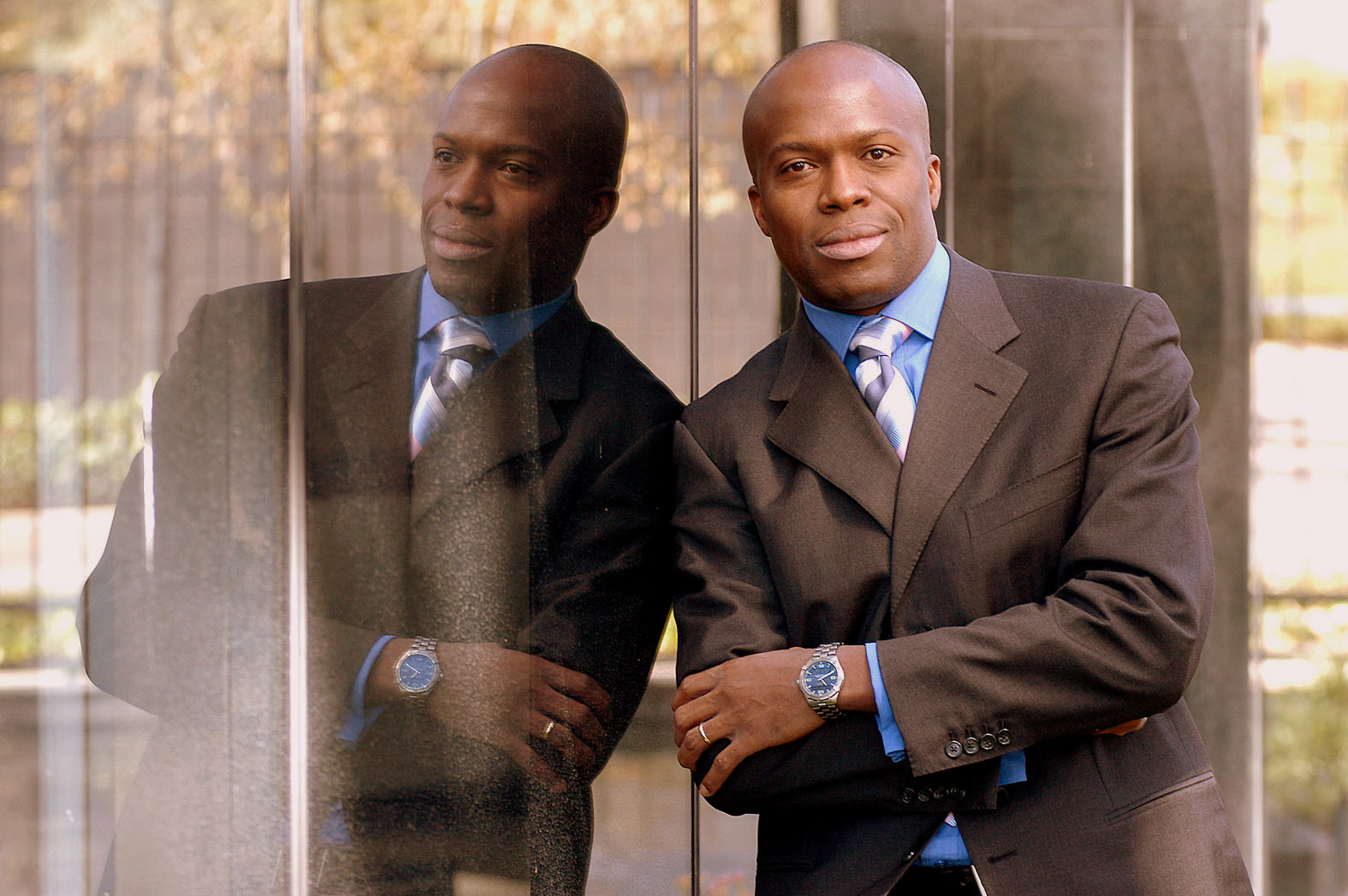
Africa Online co-founder A. Makatiani

The company was started in 1994 by Ayisi Makatiani, Karanja Gakio and Amolo Ng'weno, three Kenyans who met each other while students in Cambridge, Massachusetts. Makatiani and Gakio were at MIT while Ng'weno was at Harvard. The basic idea for an online news service for Kenyans developed from an online community hosted at MIT called KenyaNet. KenyaNet was one of several Africa-focused online communities (the others were Okyeame in Ghana, Naijanet in Nigeria, and Salonet in Sierra Leone) formed and run by MIT students and hosted on MIT servers.

With the commercialization of the internet, Africa Online moved its focus away from providing news to connecting Africans on the continent to the Internet. In 1995, the company was bought by International Wireless of Boston, which ultimately became Prodigy. During this period, Africa Online began operating as the first Kenyan ISP, and later expanded to Côte d'Ivoire (1995) to Ghana, Tanzania, Uganda, Zambia, Zimbabwe and Swaziland, with the three Kenyans continuing to manage the operation. In the process, Africa Online acquired several ISPs, such as Pipex Internet Solution (Swaziland), Net2000 (Kenya), UUNET (Namibia) and Swift Global (Uganda).

In 1998, Prodigy sold the company to the African Lakes Corporation. African Lakes had been listed on the London Stock Exchange since 1877 and was now moving away from its traditional background in agriculture and mining. For a while the company enjoyed favor from investors, listing on the Nairobi Stock Exchange in 2001, but its stock subsequently lost ground and it was delisted in both London and Nairobi in 2003. By that time, the 3 founders had departed Africa Online.

Africa Online was bought by Telkom South Africa in 2007.
