= African Broadcast Network =

Defunct pan-African television network (2001–2003)

African Broadcast Network (ABN) was a South Africa-based television network created by the African Barter Company, which up until 2000 was known for its barter syndication to multiple African territories. Similar to TVAfrica, it was a pan-African television network where its affiliate broadcasters aired its programming. Registered in the United Kingdom and with offices in Johannesburg, Ghana, Nigeria, Kenya, Zambia and Zimbabwe, it was dissolved in 2003.

== History ==
The network was formally announced on 18 October 2000. The network was set to deliver its output via satellite and most of the programmes to be screened were American, as Africa usually spent little on buying American output. One of its launch titles was set to be the US soap Passions. At the same time, the African Barter Company became an ABN subsidiary. At the end of the month, a trade launch was held in London, attracting broadcasters from Ghana, Nigeria, Tanzania, Kenya, Zambia and Zimbabwe. ABN was also starting relations with content suppliers such as Columbia, Warner Bros., Hearst and CNN. Funding was provided by the Washington DC-based Modern Africa Growth and Investment Company.

On 2 January 2001, it was announced that ABN would begin operations on 29 January. The signal was delivered from Orbicom's facilities in Johannesburg, while uplinking was done locally from its South African offices at ZSE-TV (Video RSA). In order to attract more commercial revenue into Africa, it struck a deal with Granada Media as its international sales agent.

The Zimbabwe Broadcasting Corporation announced on 9 May that it would take off its programmes from its television channel, a move which was not notified to the higher-ups in Johannesburg. Nearly two months later on 2 July, Africa Independent Television started airing ABN's service. On 18 October, Savannah Maziya was appointed its CEO. On 15 October 2001, Swazi TV started broadcasting ABN's output. A year into its operation, it had signed up advertising spots for fifteen of the largest advertisers in Africa, among them Caltex, Unilever, Reckitt & Coleman, Johnson & Johnson, Barclays Bank, Schweppes and Cadburys.

In May 2002, ABN signed deals with Television Rwanda, Television Malawi and Desert TV of Namibia. By then, ABN estimated its total viewership to be at 100 million. Desert TV was previously a TVAfrica affiliate, but left the network because of problems with the company, which wanted "excessive shares of the revenues", causing the station to suspend operations in March 2002. In mid-2002, WBS started carrying ABN, bringing the service into Uganda, though the offer was limited to Passions and its sitcom slot. Plans to expand into Francophone Africa were in the cards.

The company ultimately went insolvent at the end of 2003. In December of that year, the company was handed over to British insolvency administrator Kallis & Co.; similar to what happened to TVAfrica, its pre-sold commercial spots were illegally dumped by local broadcasters who chose to air their commercials instead.

== Programming ==
ABN started off as a one-hour satellite-fed programming block with emphasis on quality programming. It already set up goals for local programming, which it hoped to consist of 20% by the end of the first year, rising to 40% by the end of 2006. The one-hour block would increase to two hours by the end of the first year, then to three hours by the end of the second year. Unlike TVAfrica, the service was entirely free-to-air. Foreign content was obtained from trilateral cooperation between sales houses in Africa, the UK and the US.

Its launch programming consisted of the following series:

- Passions
- Damon
- Cosby
- One World
- Everybody Loves Raymond
- The King of Queens

ABN supplied footage of World Press Freedom Day on 3 May 2001 for both UNESCO and Saba. Footage was provided by the Namibian Broadcasting Corporation.

In October, it launched the African Movie of the Week slot, with thirteen titles. Network head James Makawa noticed that there were difficulties in obtaining the titles, due to a lack of database or controlling body for distributing African films. Around the same time, it added Kids Say the Darndest Things, hosted by Bill Cosby, and hoped to produce a pan-African soap opera, which it hoped to sell to the African diaspora and people of African descent in the UK, the US and the Caribbean, as well as the Paramount-produced drama series Soul Food and an additional two hours of programming per week. By the time of the October expansion, ABN's programming increased to 90 minutes a day.

During the first half of 2002, ABN's daily sitcom line-up was like this:

- Monday: The Parkers
- Tuesday: Cosby
- Wednesday: Suburban Bliss (South African sitcom)
- Thursday: The King of Queens
- Friday: Becker

It had also partnered with the Kenya Broadcasting Corporation to produce Afro Centric Arts to air on the ABN network. ABN manager Tony Clegg-Butt believed that the programme would have massive appeal in both Kenya and Africa. Passions, shown on weekdays, as well as the sitcom line-up, has been showing an increase in ratings in Kenya alone.

2002 also saw the introduction of four new hour-long dramas:

- Thursday: Walker, Texas Ranger
- Friday: The Crow
- Saturday: Psi Factor
- Sunday: Queen of Swords

== Affiliates ==
Country	Channel	Type	Period	Ref.
Ghana	Ghana Television	Public	2001–2003	
Tanzania	Independent Television	Private	2001–2003	
Kenya	KBC TV	Public	2001–2003	
Zambia	ZNBC TV	Public	2001–2003	
Zimbabwe	ZBC TV	Public	February–May 2001	
Nigeria	Africa Independent Television	Private	July 2001 – 2003	
Swaziland	Swazi TV	Public	October 2001 – 2003	
Rwanda	Television Rwanda	Public	May 2002 – 2003	
Malawi	Television Malawi	Public	May 2002 – 2003	
Namibia	Desert TV	Private	May 2002 – 2003	
Uganda	WBS Television	Private	Mid 2002–2003	

== See also ==
- African Barter Company
- TVAfrica
