= Antenne Réunion =

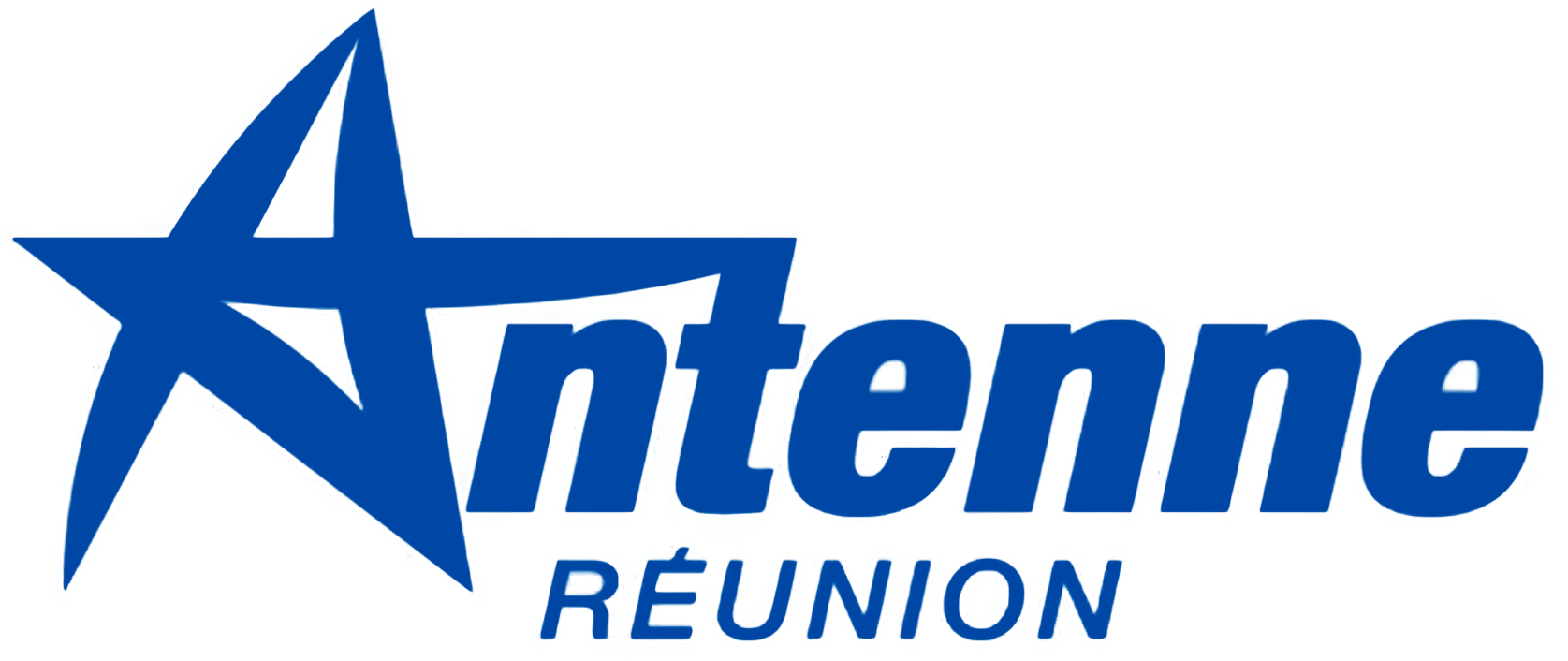
- Country: Réunion, France
- Headquarters: Saint-Denis, Réunion

Programming
- Language: French
- Picture format: 720p HDTV

Ownership
- Owner: Cirano Group

History
- Launched: 18 March 1991; 35 years ago

Links
- Website: antennereunion.fr

Availability

Terrestrial
- TNT: Channel 2

Antenne Réunion is a French overseas departmental free-to-air private television channel available in Réunion, the only channel of its kind in the island.

== History ==
On 2 March 1990, Antenne Réunion was authorized by CSA to deliver its programs on UHF channel 25, previously used without authorization by Télé Free Dom. Aiming at the youth, the new channel had to timeshare with Canal+ Réunion, which started broadcasting on 18 March 1991, before obtaining its own frequency. The initial line-up consisted of two hours and ten minutes a day of local, unencrypted programs, including a news service at 7:30pm, complemented with the encrypted offer from Canal+ for the rest of the day. In addition to two 40-minute news bulletins, the channel aired the American sitcoms Bewitched and The Cosby Show, the latter of which was selected on purpose to represent a positive image of a multi-racial family, which would click well with the local populace.

Réunion authorized five private television channels in 1992, being Antenne Réunion, Télé Free DOM, TV4, Télé Océane and TV Sud. Out of all the authorized channels, only Antenne Réunion proceeded and Télé Free DOM had its license terminated after a cyclone destroyed its transmitter, before even resuming broadcasts. The launch of Antenne Réunion caused RFO to rethink its strategies for its two television channels. Over time, the channel gradually increased its free-to-view timeslot to three hours and fifteen minutes, achieving a success rate of 90% from local surveys. This caused CSA to grant seven new transmitters for the station in July 1992. By March 1993, the channel had a deficit of 15 million francs. That same year, the channel started negotiations with TF1 to carry programming from the French network, although there were still obstacles, because, at the time, RFO still had preferential treatment for some of its programming to be seen on its stations. Subsequently, in June 1994, CSA granted the station six new frequencies and started broadcasting as a full-time independent channel on 26 September.

On 19 February 1998, the channel filed for bankruptcy, but didn't cease its operations. It then held a 34% market share but lost between 8 and 10 million francs the previous year, bringing the cumulative deficit to 45 million over seven years. Jacques de Chateauvieux, via the Bourbon group, remained the main shareholder. On 25 February, the mixed commercial court notes the status of cessation of payments and opens the judicial recovery procedure. On 6 October, 1999, a continuation plan was adopted to spread the channel's debts over 10 years. By 2001, its financial problems had not been entirely solved, but was already facing competition from satellite packages, Canal+ Réunion (September 1998) and Parabole Réunion. RFO sided with the former, Antenne Réunion, with the latter.

In January 2003, to compete with RFO in the 7-9pm slot, Antenne Réunion moved its 7:30pm bulletin to 7:20pm to attract more viewers.

In November 2016, ASDL, Antenne Réunion's holding company, majority owned by Christophe Ducasse since 2007, sold part of its shares to the local industrial group Océinde.

Since 25 November 2021, the channel is owned by the Cirano Group.
