= WBS Television =

Former Ugandan television station

- Branding: WBS Television
- Country: Uganda
- Availability: National
- Founded: 1997 by Gordon Wavamunno
- Parent: Spear Group Of Companies
- Key people: Gordon Wavamuno
- Launch date: 1999
- Picture format: 720p (HDTV)
- Language: English

WBS Television, formally known as Wavah Broadcasting Services Television was a Ugandan based television station owned by Gordon Wavamunno. On December 14, 2016, it ceased to operate as a public broadcaster after it was put under receivership over Shs7.2b tax arrears by URA.

== History ==
WBS was founded by entrepreneur Gordon Wavamuno in October 1997 and began broadcasting on 31 January 1999. The inaugural newscast was presented by Brenda Nabiryo. Colin Sserubiri presented Jam Agenda, a music show. He left for Canada in 2002. In 2002, the channel started airing the line-up of the African Broadcast Network, though limited to Passions and US sitcoms.

Reports had emerged in November 2016 that the station was sold to Zimbabwean tycoon Strive Masiyiwa, who would use its frequencies to broadcast Kwesé Sports terrestrially into Uganda. This implied the withdrawal of all non-sports programmes and presenters working at the channel.

On 13 December 2016, it was made public that WBS Television would be suspended from the following day after its failure to pay its tax debt, estimated to exceed over seven billion shillings. As of a visit by Monitor to the WBS facilities on 15 December, the channel was airing a pre-recorded playlist of music videos; while its staff were not warned for a formal closure notice. The staff also denied claims that it would be taken over by another company and converted into a sports channel.

In December 2019, three years after its collapse, WBS hinted at a relaunch early next year. An unknown tycoon was set to invest one billion shillings in it. This ended up being a mere rumour; two months later, it was announced that Next Media would take over the WBS offices by means of a lease agreement with Wavamuno.
