= YTV (Botswanan TV channel) =

- Country: Botswana
- Broadcast area: Botswana

Ownership
- Owner: YMH Group

History
- Launched: 1988
- Former names: GBC TV (1988-2010) eBotswana (2010-2020)

Links
- Website: ytv.co.bw

YTV is a Botswanan commercial television channel. The channel broadcasts general entertainment content. Throughout much of its life the channel was owned by foreigners, from launch to 2004 and again from 2007 to 2018.

== History ==
The channel started broadcasting in 1988 as Gaborone Broadcasting Company (GBC), which in its beginnings was a small viewers' association paid by fees from a limited number of its viewers. There was much reluctance in its early years, especially due to its proximity with South Africa and the ease of receiving signals from that country. Up until the early 2000s, GBC was a closed-circuit television station with coverage limited exclusively to Gaborone. Entertainment content made up much of its offer, yet it also screened educational content, both foreign and national, the latter of which in accordance with the Botswanan Ministry of Education. The station produced the first Botswanan talk show, Dumela, in 1996. The six-episode programme tackled issues such as alcohol abuse, single parenting, fashion and other topics.

In August 2002, the station gained a full broadcasting licence, having also set up terrestrial transmitters in Francistown and Selebi-Phikwe.

With the closure of TVAfrica in 2003, the station was in limbo. New programmes were created to fill the gaps left by the former partner. In 2004, it aired the local drama series Flat 101 by production company Flave, after Botswana Television had rejected. After sixteen years under British control, the station was sold to local businessman Mike Klink.

The programming by 2003 consisted of a mix of SABC, BBC and other international content, as well as locally produced news bulletins and international sporting events. In 2004, it was received by 450,000 people, of which 160,000 were regular viewers.

In September 2007, Sabido Investments, owner of e.tv in neighbouring South Africa, bought 49% of the channel's shares, aiming to go national at the long term. With the buyout, the station underwent through massive technical upgrades, ahead of a revamp initially slated for 1 May 2008. The new schedule started on 15 July.

In early 2010, the National Broadcasting Board approved the rename of the channel to eBotswana, to match the new part-owners, and pledged to introduce a new, improved programming offer, while still lacking a national license, which was described by the station's general manager David Coles as being a long process. The new name would be put to place as early as April.

The new identity as eBotswana was introduced on 1 April 2010. In conjunction with the rename, both the transmitting network and the quality of its programming have improved. In order to increase its terrestrial coverage, it moved from the GBC-era transmitter at Kgale Hill to a new one at Gabane Hill. This enabled more areas adjacent to Gaborone to pick up the signal. The new programming, a mix of local content with South African and American imports, proved to be a hit with viewers. After the shutdown of illegal SABC satellite relays widely used by Botswanans on 30 June 2013, eBotswana signed a contract with the SABC (which was the parent company's competitor in South Africa) to legally air its soap operas, namely Generations and Muvhango.
