= Ayisi Makatiani =

Kenyan businessman

Ayisi N Makatiani
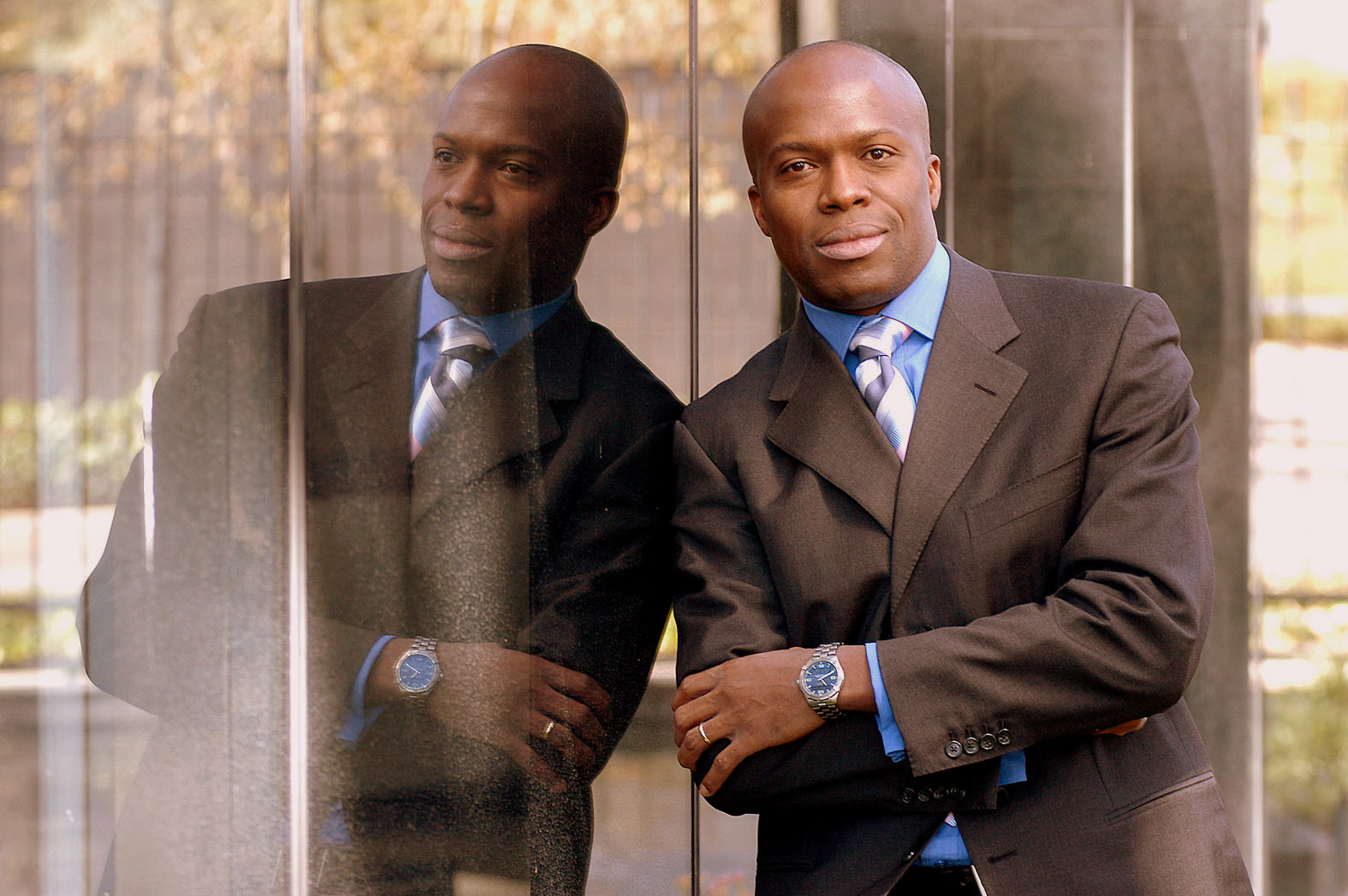
- Born: September 24, 1966 (age 59); Kenya
- Education: Massachusetts Institute of Technology (1986 - 1990)
- Occupation: CEO of Fanisi Capital Ltd

Ayisi N. Makatiani is the managing partner and CEO of Fanisi Capital Ltd, which manages the Fanisi Venture Capital Fund for investing in East Africa (Kenya, Uganda, Tanzania and Rwanda). Makatiani has been featured in The Economist, Fortune (magazine), CNN, NHK, BBC, Financial Times (London). He has been voted as the top East Africa CEO three times in a row by his peers.

== Early life ==
Makatiani was educated at Maseno School (Kenya) and thereafter Alliance High School, regarded as one of Kenya's top schools. He received a bachelor's degree in electrical and electronics engineering from Massachusetts Institute of Technology (MIT) and a minor in economics with a thesis done at the MIT Sloan School of Management.

== Career ==
Since 2005, Makatiani has been an adviser to the president of the Republic of Kenya as a member of the National Economic and Social Council (NESC). He currently sits on the boards of Kenya Airways and Ogilvy & Mather (East Africa). Makatiani has in the past been adviser to the UN secretary general (Kofi Annan on ICT) and been on the board of Barclays Bank, Kenya, and on the advisory board of International Chamber of Commerce (ICC) E-Magazine, Paris, France; as well as being a former executive director of African Lakes Corporation PLC – London Stock Exchange listed.

Before Fanisi, Makatiani was the CEO of African Management Services Company (AMSCO), a product of International Finance Corporation (IFC)—the World Bank's private-sector arm—the UN Development Programme (UNDP), and the African Development Bank. Before AMSCO, he co-founded Africa Online, the largest Internet Service Provider across Africa, with operations in 10 countries spanning the whole continent. He is also the chairman of the board of directors for Jambojet, a low-cost carrier fully owned by Kenya Airways
