= Luanda Magere =

Folk hero

Folklore of the Luo peoples of Kenya speaks of a mighty warrior known as Lwanda Magere. He was born in the year 1720 to Abonyo Wuod Omolo and his mother, Nyabera. After his mother died during his birth, he was taken into the care of his grandmother, Rapondi. His father died in one of the numerous wars with their Nandi neighbors when Magere was barely a teenager. He belonged to the Sidho clan in Kano, on the shores of Lake Victoria. The Sidho clan occupies the present-day sugar belt at the foot of the Nandi escarpment. He possessed unearthly powers, and his flesh was made of stone. He deflected arrows, spears and clubs, making him invincible during war. He was famously known for his capability to tear an entire army apart on his own.

Story The traditional Luo enemies at the time were the jo Lang'o, the Luo name for the Kalenjin community. The Lang'o, tired of being defeated in war by the Luo, sat down with Nandi elders to discuss the issue and came to the conclusion that they would give Lwanda Magere the woman Maryann to marry, claiming it was a gesture of peace. Maryann's real role was to find out how to defeat him. Though the Luo elders advised him not to marry her, Luanda Magere did not heed their advice.

After many attempts, Maryann was successful when, one day, he fell ill and called for Maryann to take care of him. Luanda instructed her to cut his shadow with a knife and administer the medicine. She was surprised when she saw his shadow bleed. That night, she crept out of Lwanda's home, ran back to her people and told them her husband's weakness.

They then attacked the Luo. The Luo fought fiercely and Lwanda killed so many Nandi warriors that they decided to retreat. As they were running, one Nandi warrior remembered that Lwanda's strength was in his shadow. He stood at a hill and threw his spear at Lwanda's shadow. Luanda Magere fell down and died, and his body turned to stone.

As is the case with many myths, the story comes with several variations depending on the source material.

== Legacy ==
A site in Sidho, near Awasi in the former Nyando District of Kenya, has a stone revered as the spot where Luanda Magere died. Legend has it that Luo warriors sharpened their blades on the shrine before battles. People come from far and wide to conduct rituals and prayers at the site. Luanda Magere is still celebrated among the Luo through song and dance, and several animated shorts have been created based on the story.
