= Joe (magazine) =

Joe Magazine
- Editor: Terry Hirst, Hilary Ng'weno, Oscar Festus
- Categories: Youth Magazine
- Frequency: infrequently
- Circulation: 10,000-30,000
- First issue: 1973
- Final issue: 1979
- Company: Private
- Country: Kenya
- Language: English

Joe was a magazine published in Kenya between 1973 and 1979, at the height of what publisher Henry Chakava described as the "fat years" of Kenyan publishing. Joe was one of several publications aimed at the new urban middle and lower-middle classes, and used subversive humour, art and fiction as a medium for cultural, social and political analysis. The magazine also provided a platform for new artists and fiction writers.

== History ==
Joe magazine was founded by writer/publisher Hillary Ng'weno and artist Terry Hirst in 1973. The magazine was named after "Joe", a common man who used humour to deal with the realities of urban life in contemporary Africa, and encouraged readers to do the same, in dialogue with the character and the magazine. Hirst described Joe as "a survivor who has to laugh to keep from crying."

Inspired by South African magazine Drum, Joe used street-wise language in comic strips, fiction stories and themed columns to articulate the everyday problems of the urban population. Its letters column, "Dear Joe", encouraged interaction from readers. The magazine also carried an original short story in every issue, featuring writers including Sam Kahiga, Meja Mwangi, and Ngũgĩ wa Thiong'o. Joe also made distinctive use of graphics, drawings, illustrated jokes and comic strips, including "City Life" by Edward Gitau, "O.K, Sue! A City-Girl's View" by Kimani Gathingiri and Terry Hirst's "Daddy Wasiwasi & Co" and "The Good, the Bed and the Ugali".

Ng'weno left the magazine in 1974. In 1979 Hirst renamed the magazine Joe Homestead, increasing the number of comic strips and adding a new section on family, nutrition and health. However, the new title did not attract advertisers and the magazine shut down in August 1979.
