= TVAfrica =

Pan-African television network

- Country: Mauritius; South Africa
- Broadcast area: Africa
- Headquarters: Saint Denis, Mauritius (legal); Johannesburg, South Africa (operational)

Programming
- Languages: English; French

Ownership
- Owner: TVAfrica Operations S.A. Pty Ltd (Africa Media Group)

History
- Launched: July 1998
- Closed: 1 October 2003 (liquidation); 2005 (closure of the company)
- Former names: dTb (Direct-to-Broadcast; programming unit, pre-1998); Direct-to-Broadcaster Programming (1998); African Broadcast Network (1998–1999); STV (East Africa; 1998–2002)

TVAfrica was a pan-African television network founded in 1998 by former advertising executive Dave Kelly alongside sports broadcaster Berry Lambert. Domiciled in Mauritius and operating from South Africa, the network relayed up to 80% of its content to private television stations in sub-Saharan Africa and also licensed the broadcast of sporting events (excluding South Africa due to licensing regulations) to interested broadcasters. At its apex, the channel broadcast to as many as 26 countries (up to 40 in licensed sporting events), the majority of them English-speaking and French-speaking states. There were four separate versions, three in English and one in French.

Funding problems led to the liquidation of the channel in October 2003.

== History ==
=== Origins as Direct-to-Broadcast/Direct-to-Broadcaster Programming and African Broadcast Network ===
TVAfrica was founded in 1997 and started broadcasting in July 1998 (some sources say June 1998) from its operational base in South Africa. The founders were Barry Lambert and David Kelly, with funding provided by the Zephyr Management Group, the Africa Investment Group and the South Africa Enterprise Development Fund. Domiciled in Mauritius, the network's broadcasting facilities were located in South Africa, Kenya, Nigeria and the Ivory Coast.

Initially it was a programme provider. Its programming division started off as dTb (Direct To Broadcast, some sources reported the name "Direct to Broadcaster Programming"), whose concept was to buy free-to-air terrestrial rights of "quality programming" to attract viewers and advertisers. dTb had assisted in the upgrading of Joy TV, which used the frequencies of the second channel of the Zimbabwe Broadcasting Corporation, in mid-1998, providing it with expansion to Bulawayo, up until that point the channel was only received in Harare. TVAfrica's programming packages were sent to the widest number of commercial stations possible. Affiliates would benefit heavily from the advertising money brought in from the attractive programming. The company, under the corporate name Direct To Broadcaster Programming, started delivering its service on 1 July 1998.

The programming model was similar to the American television network format, with affiliates across the coverage area. The network started with affiliates in four countries, Botswana, Kenya, Uganda and Zimbabwe before extending its reach to more than two dozen countries and over 40 affiliates. Uganda, one of the first affiliates, came from a reshaping of the line-up of Sanyu Television, Uganda's first privately owned television channel. Sanyu was joined by STV in Kenya, Joy TV in Zimbabwe and GBC TV in Botswana. Similar to other programming barter companies, its model involved programming offered for free, with the advertising revenue being shared between TVAfrica (international advertisers), the local broadcaster (three minutes of local commercials) and network spots being split during the 10 minutes per hour. Programming packages were compiled in Johannesburg and encoded to Intelsat in order to prevent piracy.

On 7 November 1998, Direct to Broadcaster Programming was renamed Africa Broadcast Network (no relation to the later syndicator African Broadcast Network). Later that month, ABN bought Sanyu TV from the Katto family, for the sum of US$5.5 million, "a considerable amount of money" according to Lambert, compared to other affiliates at the time. The sale was finalized in April 1999. Negotiations had been underway since July 1998, but ABN wanted a takeover. The station changed its logo to a modified version of TVAfrica's bearing the STV initials. TVAfrica also managed STV in Kenya, whose coverage was initially limited to Nairobi and extended to Mombasa and Kisumu. Its control of STV led to a period of expansion during April 2000, becoming available in seven cities.

=== As TVAfrica ===
At the end of 1999, all units of the company were now reportedly using the corporate name TVAfrica. It already had an agreement in place with Television Malawi, a state channel, which at the time had financial problems and limited equipment, and in early 2000, the Nigerian private channel Channels Television.

TVAfrica quickly became successful, owing primarily to two factors, convenience and high quality entertainment. Operations in East Africa were still branded as STV, but in 2000 a new generic name was considered for all of its operations.

The network stemmed out of a gradual process of liberalisation of television stations across the African continent in the 90s. Networks in individual markets were still touted as being propagandistic, leaning to their respective governments of the time, whereas the emerging private television sector was still facing heavy difficulties at the time, with many channels shutting down over time. In May 2000, it assisted in the creation of the Nigérien private channel Ténéré TV, delivering it with five hours of programming.

Quentin Green left e.tv where he had a job as sales and managing director and joined TVAfrica in April 2001.

TVAfrica also faced competition from another syndicator, the African Broadcast Network (ABN), domiciled in the United Kingdom, which tied in with state television channels in several countries.

=== Expansion ===
2001 was a year of growth for TVAfrica. The network signed an agreement with Ethiopia Television's second channel to carry the whole schedule, as well as signing further agreements with SBC in the Seychelles and MBC in Mauritius (the country where its parent was registered) while an agreement with Eri-TV was on the cards. The company estimated that only 0.8% of the continent had subscription television services (46 million viewers), yet its coverage – thanks to separate sporting agreements – was higher. On 17 October 2001, Quentin Green, Chief Operating Officer of the network, sought for the creation of new terrestrial broadcasting partnerships, at the Broadcast World Africa in Johannesburg. Under this investment, TVAfrica sought to buy six to eight transmitters for satellite reception and giving coverage to 60 to 70% of a country's population. The network had projected that by 2007, advertising on sub-Saharan African TV would increase from US$160 million to US$410 million, adjusting to factors such as increased access to television sets and liberalisation of media. It also invested 55% into the Desert Entertainment Group, owners of Desert TV, Namibia's first private television station, which was due to launch in June.

The channel secured the exclusive rights to the African Cup of Nations starting from its 2002 edition in a deal that was valid until 2008. In early 2002, it assisted in the financial rebound of Radio-Télévision Analamanga and started airing four hours of its French output per day. In April, it acquired CTV in Uganda and made STV the sole East African arm of the network.

The network boosted its potential viewership base upon purchasing the rights to the 2002 FIFA World Cup, having sold 90% of the potential sponsorship packages a month and a half ahead of the start of the tournament. The syndication formula had already become a win-win at the time. The network had paid $1.5 million for the rights in Nigeria alone.

TVAfrica moved to new premises in the Morningside suburb of Johannesburg on 17 May 2002, two weeks before the start of the World Cup. The new facilities cost US$1.8 million out of the US$22.5 million it had received in the first few months of 2002 alone, by developing the technological capabilities of the network to include two production studios, six editing facilities and four final control centres for the four feeds of the channel. The World Cup coverage was presented by South African sports journalist Louis Karpas from the new building, as well as an educational programme. The move also introduced a new version of the network's logo and a new slogan, "all round entertainment". Late in 2002, TVAfrica set up a new Namibian affiliate from scratch, partnering with local production company INTV, as well as holding 20% of the stocks of STV in Mozambique. Building on from the rebrand, the channel added two continuity announcers, George Munetsi Biza from Zimbabwe and Irene Ndlovu from Kenya. On 1 September that year, TV3 became the new Ghanaian affiliate of the network, after Metro TV left it.

Founder Barry Lambert left TVAfrica in 2002 to found LIM Africa, which in 2005 partnered with Setanta Sports to later set up an African version of the channel and licensing agreements with free-to-air broadcasters.

Following the outbreak of the First Ivorian Civil War, TVAfrica decided to close its regional office in Abidjan in November 2002. STV in Mozambique withdrew its affiliation agreement in early 2003 as the content didn't match local tastes.

=== Liquidation ===
Africa Media Group, the parent company of the channel, decided to put TVAfrica up for liquidation on 1 October 2003. A number of alternative solutions to keep the network afloat were considered, but neither of the options was suitable for its economic climate, prompting the station to go off air and liquidate, as the operation didn't meet expectations at the long term. Dave Kelly still showed belief in the idea of such a network, but it was complicated, on the grounds that its US investors did not apply the capital properly. He and Quentin Green left the network owing to disagreements ahead of its liquidation.

"One of my great sadnesses – apart from the fact that I invested five years and quite a lot of my money – is that people will say there goes another failed African project. But I still think it's doable. I'm now trying to raise funds for another try. I'd like not to have just financial investors but also a strategic investor as a partner who understands the media business." – Dave Kelly on the liquidation of TVAfrica

—

One of the factors that led to the collapse of the network was its affiliation with smaller television stations, almost all of them commercial, in opposition to the dominating TV channels in many countries that were under government control.

Affiliates also blocked the network's commercial breaks in order to insert their own ones, blocking commercials for clients already booked by the network. This caused problems in the advertising scheme, disabling TVAfrica from billing its clients.

The shutdown of the network exposed the fragile status of building a pan-African television network, as well as the status of media in Africa in general. Channels Television in Uganda announced on 2 October 2003 that it would resume operation, but without the TVAfrica programming. One of its popular programmes, The Young and the Restless, was removed as it was part of the network's output, Its prospective affiliate in Sierra Leone, ABC Television-Africa, was expected to commence transmission in October 2003, but the effects of the closure caused its launch to be delayed; the lack of the network caused its chairman to find new foreign partners.

New channels and companies took over the frequencies and operations of TVAfrica in some countries weeks after its liquidation, in Namibia One Africa Television took over, while in Nigeria Proudly Africa Media replaced the activities of the former West African unit of the network to its affiliates. The new replacement company also expanded its local production activities in Nigeria and Ghana. All of its other operations were shut down.

== Programming ==
"The biggest challenge is raising the hurdle of the African continent and getting over it." – Dave Kelly on the need to create an African content market

—

TVAfrica's lineup consisted primarily of American and British television series as well as international sporting events, broadcast either on full-time or part-time affiliates (the latter affiliates only carried sports broadcasts). In its early years, TVAfrica lacked its own news programme, instead relaying a daily half-hour of news from BBC World and affiliates resorted to air their own newscasts. Thanks to initial agreements with the early affiliates, these carried five hours on weekdays and seven hours on weekends, including sports.

Most of the programming was in English, but programming in French was also carried, to cater affiliates in Benin, Burundi, Gabon, Niger and Togo. TVAfrica had the ability to sell time to local advertisers in programming packages sent to terrestrial broadcasters. These programmes were similar in nature to the ones carried by M-Net and other DStv channels. Local African programming primarily came from the Nigerian and Kenyan bureaux, but such programming was in short supply. The local affiliates were responsible for the production of news output for the service, where available.

TVAfrica sponsored and held boxing matches in countries where it had an affiliate in an attempt to create permanent fixtures, with three bouts in November and December 1999 in Swaziland and one in Botswana in January 2000. These events were, according to Barry Lambert, a "nursery" to train boxers to later develop their international careers. With the success of the boxing events, TVAfrica also equated the creation of other similar events with other sports, as well as equating the creation of a pan-African daily news programme.

TVAfrica in its beginnings carried a heavy amount of foreign (mostly American) TV series, such as Friends, Suddenly Susan, Malcolm and Eddie and ER, as well as sporting events such as WWF and the Premier League. There was no children's programming at first, but in 2000 it was announced that such a block would be added.

In 2001, Africa Business Tonight premiered, a daily 15-minute bulletin about business in the continent. That same year, TVAfrica lost the rights to broadcast the Premier League to SuperSport.

The biggest focus was TVAfrica's sports output, Premier Sport, which complemented the sports offerings on the state broadcasters. The East African version of the network produced a "sharp" mini-series with assistance from the BBC, Heart and Soul. Heart and Soul premiered on KBC1 in Kenya on 6 July 2002 and aired on the TVAfrica network two days later.

In May 2002, the channel introduced 7 Days, a weekly newsmagazine, with inserts provided by the affiliates, and the pre-existing Africa Business Tonight had its length doubled from 15 minutes to 30. Further plans for 2002 included a cooking show, concerts from artists from the countries where the network had affiliates and a gameshow.

Educational programming started in line with the move to Morningside. Titled African Learning Channel, inserted in the children's slot K Club, this consisted of a pre-recorded curriculum slot followed by a second slot where teacher-presenter William Smith answered questions related to school subjects live by telephone. The five targets of the initial phase were Uganda, Malawi, Tanzania, Rwanda and Botswana. The pre-requisite for taking part involved access to a TVA affiliate and a phone line. Initially these broadcasts were aimed at Tanzania (East feed) and Botswana (South feed). A Tanzanian commercial company had signed an agreement to sponsor the telephones and television sets enabling children to phone to the presenter. The project followed a two-week experiment that started on 13 March.

The network carried the 2002 FIFA World Cup having spent $1.5 million.

A celebrity cooking show (Taste of Africa) was added in October 2002. The show was presented by Tich Mataz and filmed on location in ten countries, with each episode having a guest star from the specific country.

Overnight simulcasts of BBC World were added to the feeds (and subsequently its affiliates) in January 2003. At the time, the network covered seven million households.

On 11 August 2002, Guinness TV specials started on TVAfrica, aired on Sundays in the English feeds and Fridays on the French feed. The three-hour programming block aired from 8pm to 11pm and consisted of a mixture of documentaries and feature films. The first slot was given to biographical documentaries about success stories, the second slot covered current affairs docu-dramas and the third slot consisted of feature films, such as The Pelican Brief and The Bodyguard. Negotiations were underway in December 2002 to air the League of Wales on the network, negotiated by John Fashanu. The cause was the influx of Nigerian players entering the league.

In its last year on air, the network grabbed the rights to the Brazilian national football championship's 2003 season. The Anglophone feeds aired two matches and the Francophone feed one match. In late May, network executive Naomi Agaba reported that the weekly 9-10pm timeslot was doing well, with the introduction of series such as Friends, I'll Fly Away and Gabriel's Fire. This replaced the local programming slot, which moved to an earlier timeslot (7-8pm). Soaps aired at 8-9pm on weeknights, these at the time were Loving and Generations. ER aired on weekends. It also started carrying This Week, a current affairs programme from the BBC.

In July 2003, TVAfrica signed an agreement with Nigerian company Wale Adenuga Productions to distribute its series Odd World.

After the closure of TVAfrica, Africa Business Tonight was outsourced to African Business Channel, owners of Summit Television in South Africa, and was carried by one of its successors in Nigeria and Ghana.

== Affiliates ==
The number of affiliates varied constantly. When TVAfrica filed for liquidation in 2003, it had 39 affiliates in 23 countries. Another source claimed that the number was 34 affiliates in 24 countries. The highest reported number, around the time of the World Cup in 2002, was 45 affiliates in 26 countries.

TVAfrica was divided in three English feeds (East, West, South) and a French feed. Most affiliates relied on TVAfrica for live sports, others relayed the entire schedule.

The company's modus operandi also involved partial or total control of private television stations in Africa. In some countries, up to two channels were eligible, yet in Nigeria, the number was up to 20. Candidates for affiliate status should have a suitable broadcasting license, financial stability, apolitical programming and strategy and abidance to the national regulator. In most cases, TVAfrica wasn't responsible for investments in broadcasting infrastructure, leaving that to the affiliates.

The rationale behind the affiliate system was deeply rooted in the lack of money the affiliates had in acquire programming. By relying on the network's pre-packaged content formula, this gave audiences to advertisers and programming to affiliated broadcasters. The four feeds all had the same programming, disregarding the regions each channel was broadcasting to.

=== East ===
Country	Channel	Type	Amount	Period	Ref.
Ethiopia	Ethiopia Television	Public	Sports	?-2003	
Ethiopia	ETV2	Public	Whole schedule	?-2003	
Eritrea	Eri-TV	Public	Sports	?-2003	
Kenya	STV	Private	Whole schedule	1998–2003	
Tanzania (Zanzibar)	Television Zanzibar	Public	Sports	?-2003	
Tanzania (mainland)	Channel Ten	Private	Whole schedule	2000–2003	
Seychelles	SBC	Public	Sports	?-2003	
Uganda	Sanyu Television	Private	Whole schedule (renamed TVAfrica Uganda in 2002)	1998–2003	
Uganda	Channel Television	Private	Whole schedule (renamed TVAfrica Uganda in 2002)	2002–2003	
Rwanda	Tele10	Private	Whole schedule	?-2003	
Burundi	Tele10	Private	Whole schedule	?-2003	

=== West ===
Country	Channel	Type	Amount	Period	Ref.
Nigeria	Nigerian Television Authority	Public	Sports	?-2003	
Nigeria	NTA2	Public	Whole schedule	?-2003	
Nigeria	Minaj Broadcast International	Private	Whole schedule	?-2003	
Nigeria	Africa Independent Television	Private	Whole schedule	?-2003	
Nigeria	Murhi International Television	Private	Whole schedule	?-2003	
Nigeria	Galaxy TV	Private	Whole schedule	?-2003	
Nigeria	DBN	Private	Whole schedule	?-2003	
Nigeria	Africa Independent Television	Private	Whole schedule	?-2003	
Nigeria	Channels Television	Private	Whole schedule	2000–2003	
Nigeria	DITV	Private	Whole schedule	?-2003	
Nigeria	Rivers State Television	State public	Whole schedule	?-2003	
Nigeria	ITV Benin	Private	Whole schedule	?-2003	
Nigeria	Anambra TV	State public	Whole schedule	?-2003	
Nigeria	Broadcasting Corporation of Abia	State public	Whole schedule	?-2003	
Nigeria	Cross River TV	State public	Whole schedule	?-2003	
Nigeria	Imo Broadcasting Television	State public	Whole schedule	?-2003	
Nigeria	Kaduna State Television	State public	Whole schedule	?-2003	
Nigeria	Katsina RTV	State public	Whole schedule	?-2003	
Nigeria	Kebbi State TV	State public	Whole schedule	?-2003	
Nigeria	OSRC TV	State public	Whole schedule	?-2003	
Nigeria	Rivers State TV	State public	Whole schedule	?-2003	
Nigeria	TV Taraba	State public	Whole schedule	?-2003	
Nigeria	Plateau TV	State public	Whole schedule	?-2003	
Ghana	GTV	Public	Sports	?-2003	
Ghana	Metro TV	Private	Whole schedule	?-31 Dec 2001 (revoked)	
Ghana	TV3 Ghana	Private	Whole schedule	1 Sep 2002–2003	
Cameroon	CRTV	Public	Sports	?-2003	
Cameroon	Spectrum TV	Private	Whole schedule	?-2003	
Sierra Leone	SLBS	Public	Sports	?-2003	
Sierra Leone	ABC Television-Africa	Private	Whole schedule	2003 (halted before launch because of the closure of the network)	
Liberia	LBC	Public	Sports	?-2003	
The Gambia	GRTS	Public	Sports	?-2003	

The list of affiliates in Nigeria is incomplete, as it was recorded that there were 48 of them as of the time of the 2002 FIFA World Cup.

=== South ===
Country	Channel	Type	Amount	Period	Ref.
Angola	Televisão Pública de Angola	Public	Sports	?-2003	
Namibia	Namibian Broadcasting Corporation	Public	Sports	?-2003	
Namibia	Desert TV	Private	Whole schedule	?-Mar 2002 (withdrawn because the company wanted "excessive shares of their revenues", moved to competing syndicator ABN in May 2002)	
Namibia	TVAfrica Namibia	Private	Whole schedule	Sep 2002-2003 (liquidated and renamed One Africa Television)	
Botswana	Botswana Television	Public	Sports	2000–2003	
Botswana	GBC TV	Private	Whole schedule	1998–2003	
Zimbabwe	ZBC TV	Public	Sports	?-2003	
Zimbabwe	Joy TV	Public	Whole schedule	1998–2003	
Malawi	Television Malawi	Public	Whole schedule	1999–2003	
Mozambique	Televisão de Moçambique	Public	Sports	?-2003	
Mozambique	STV	Private	Whole schedule	2002-2003 (withdrawn before its liquidation because most of its content was American, which was not quite the type of content its audience preferred)	
Swaziland	Swazi TV	Public	Sports	?-2003	
Lesotho	Lesotho Television	Public	Whole schedule	May 2002 – 2003 (replacing a former agreement with M-Net)	

=== French ===
Country	Channel	Type	Amount	Period	Ref.
Ivory Coast	La Première	Public	Sports	?-2003	
Ivory Coast	La 2	Public	Whole schedule	?-2003	
Senegal	RTS 1	Public	Sports	?-2003	
Benin	Office de Radiodiffusion et Télévision du Bénin	Public	Whole schedule	?	
Togo	Togolese Television	Public	Whole schedule	?-2003	
Togo	TVG2	Private	Whole schedule	?-2003	
Burkina Faso	Radio Télévision du Burkina	Public	Sports	?-2003	
Mali	Office de Radiodiffusion-Télévision du Mali	Public	Sports	?-2003	
Niger	Ténéré TV	Private	Whole schedule	2000–2003	
Gabon	TV+	Private	Whole schedule	?-2003	
Central African Republic	Télévision Centrafricaine	Public	Sports	?-2003	
Republic of the Congo	Télé Congo	Public	Sports	?-2003	
Democratic Republic of the Congo	Radio-Télévision nationale congolaise	Public	Sports	?-2003	
Guinea	Radio Télévision Guinéenne	Public	Sports	?-2003	
Mauritius	MBC3	Public	Sports	?-2003	
Madagascar	Radio-Télévision Analamanga	Private	Whole schedule	?-2003	

== Controversies ==
=== Nigeria ===
In 2000, the network took the Nigerian Television Authority to court over illegalities in the licensing of UEFA Euro 2000, which had been taken over from Canal France Internationale. NTA was forced to remove its carriage of the championship, resulting in piracy issues. The NBC believed that TVAfrica wasn't registered to the regulator, causing Channels Television (which had obtained the rights from them) and other channels relaying its content to cease the relays or face sanctions by the commission. Channels Television was also interested in Euro 2000, but also faced the same problems as NTA, under the grounds that TVAfrica was not registered in Nigeria. The NBC accused TVAfrica of beaming its programming without following "internationally acceptable standards", while the Association of Movie Producers of Nigeria probed the network in July. Moreover, concerns were raised about the lack of African programming. To offset these issues, TVAfrica planned to invest 30 million naira in local content all over Africa for a ten-year period, valid until 2010.

The 2002 African Cup of Nations held in Mali caused massive controversy over the lack of free-to-air television rights in Nigeria, under the grounds that TVAfrica was a content provider and not a television channel. In addition, TV channels in Nigeria would only air the matches without airing commercials for alcoholic beverages before 9:45pm, per local rules. TVAfrica gave the stations a package of foreign commercials that were sourced by the company with directives for the affiliates to not feature local representatives of brands or even local adverts.

Outside of sports broadcasts, affiliates of the Nigerian Television Authority, TVAfrica's main competitor, were strongly discouraged from broadcasting the output of the network, as NTA was long-established and had more priority.

=== Ethiopia ===
During 2000, when the government decided to open up to new licenses, some Ethiopian legal experts believed that the broadcast of TVAfrica on local television channels was illegal, under the grounds that there was no regulatory body for broadcasting. On 25 February 2003, deputy general manager of ETV Asefa Bekele told The Sub-Saharan Informer to withdraw TVAfrica's programming, which he thought to be unsuitable with the Ethiopian cultural climate. Moreover, he was concerned that TVAfrica only offered "one or two advertisements a day", while at the beginning, there were concerns that it would take away parts of its advertising revenue. TVAfrica in Ethiopia was limited to Addis Ababa and its surroundings.

=== Other countries ===
The effects of TVAfrica's win over CFI in the rights to carry Euro 2000 were noted in the French-speaking countries, where the matches carried by TVAfrica's affiliates in Francophone markets were shown in English. The CFI-backed satellite operator, Le SAT, had no sports channel in its offering. ORTB and CRTV, part-time affiliates of the network, relayed the matches in French, unlike the majority of the countries.

Independent Television in Tanzania illegally broadcast the early matches of the 2002 FIFA World Cup. During the broadcast of the match between Nigeria and Argentina on 2 June, TVAfrica staff interrupted ITV's commentary as they were breaching the rights to cover the matches. ITV was also in a rights lock with Africa Media Group-owned Dar es Salaam Television. The channel was using a feed that was reserved for Televisão de Moçambique. After ITV refused to comply with the measure, TVAfrica inserted a scrolling message which said that, if the broadcasts were received outside of Mozambique, the satellite feed and the channels involved were infringing the law. Finally, TVAfrica and ITV came to terms and carried the rest of the World Cup legally. Later that month, KBC in Kenya did not telecast the Budget speech, being contractually obliged to air the match between Italy and Mexico on 13 June. KBC had opted out of another match (Cameroon vs. Ireland) to cover the Madaraka Day celebrations at the Nyayo Stadium in Nairobi earlier in the tournament.

At closing time, the network was criticized due to its reliance on affiliation agreements with smaller television stations and programming that did not cater to the tastes of the viewing audience. Most of the content seen on the service was American, which many viewers didn't like. This also counterbalanced the amount of local programming, which would have saved the network from collapsing.

== See also ==
Similar companies, also defunct:

- African Barter Company
- African Broadcast Network
