= Réunion La Première (television) =

- Country: Réunion, France
- Network: La Première
- Headquarters: Saint-Denis, Réunion

Programming
- Language: French
- Picture format: 720p HDTV

Ownership
- Owner: France Télévisions

History
- Launched: 24 December 1964; 60 years ago
- Former names: ORTF Télé Réunion (1965–1975); FR3-Réunion (1975–1982); RFO Réunion (1983–1986); RFO 1 Réunion (1986–1999); Télé Réunion (1999–2010); Réunion 1^{re} (2010–2018)

Links
- Website: la1ere.francetvinfo.fr/reunion/

Availability

Terrestrial
- TNT: Channel 1

Réunion La Première (French pronunciation: [ʁe.ynjɔ̃ la pʁəmjɛʁ]; lit. 'Réunion the First'), is a French overseas departmental free-to-air television channel available in Réunion. It is operated by the overseas unit of France Télévisions and competes with Antenne Réunion for viewers.

== History ==
Michel Debré was elected deputy for Réunion in 1963. Under the leadership of the new deputy, the island entered the era of modernity marked by the very strong support of the Réunion MP in the decision of the French government in May 1963 to install television on the island, as well as in the French West Indies. Plans to activate an RTF transmitter near Saint-Denis, were enacted, which would serve 80,000 inhabitants in order to initially cover the most populated areas and which would be susceptible to later extensions. The first phase of media installation work costs 150 million CFA francs. The transmitter installed in the Mountain by RTF technicians. only covers Saint-Denis and Sainte-Marie. There were only a few hundred televisions on the island whose price exceeded one month's average salary, but orders poured in quickly.

On Thursday, 24 December 1964 (Christmas Eve), at 7:30pm, Alain Peyrefitte, Minister of Information, inaugurated the ORTF television station. in Réunion with a televised speech in which he specifies that "with television, Réunion has entered the upward path of progress", followed by some short news, a romantic tale entitled Violons de poche with Jacques Douai and Olivier Hussenot, Albert Raisner's show Âge tendre... et tête de bois avec du yé-yé (Les Surfs, Franck Alamo, Sophie et les Missiles) and the presence of Jacques Brel, and finally, the Christmas Pastoral.

The island's first television news bulletin was broadcast on 4 January 1965 from the Center d'Actualités Télévisées (CAT) in Barachois. It only lasts about ten minutes and was made up of two subjects on the visit of Minister Alain Peyrefitte to Réunion, one silent of 4 min 05 s on the arrival of the minister at the airport, and the other silent of 6 minutes and 10 seconds on his visit to Saint-Denis. The next day, the minister's speech at the prefecture is broadcast, the first subject with audio, which lasted 16 minutes and 30 seconds. The subject on the eruption of Piton de la Fournaise which took place a few days earlier, was 14 minutes and 37 seconds long. The presenter was journalist Jean Vincent-Dolor, who doubled as the editor-in-chief. He is then joined by Arlette Rouvière and Henri Lebègue at the presentation. At that time, the staff was entirely recruited locally and it was not until the competitive recruitment of Memona Hintermann-Afféjee and Sulliman Banian that people of Reunion origin began to obtain in-house journalist training. For the production of the television news, the station has access to AFP dispatches, but since the image tapes are sent from Paris by plane, they always arrive a few days late. Thus, the people of Reunion received the national and international news announced by the news presenter before being able to see them in images until a few days later. When it came to local news, the station only produced four local stories per day.

Daily airtime was limited to three or four hours of programs which centered around a few interviews, local reports, shows or films imported from mainland France. These pioneering broadcasts only concern a few hundred households. With an average price of 100,000 CFA francs for a 56cm screen, television was still synonymous with luxury.

Equipment with television receivers grew rapidly in Reunion, going from 7,000 in 1966 for a population of 416,525 inhabitants to 25,300 in 1971 for 457,900 inhabitants. During the ten years of ORTF Télévision Réunion, the managers of the station implemented a network of transmitters which covers the entire coastal strip of Réunion. The greatest difficulty lies in the steep terrain of the island which leaves some gray areas, particularly in the Hauts and in the south-east of the island.

Following the breakup of the ORTF in July 1974, the regional television stations of French overseas territories were integrated into the new national program company France Régions 3 (FR3), the new French regional channel, within the FR3 DOM-TOM delegation. The channel became FR3-Réunion on 6 January 1975 and, like each metropolitan regional station, produced and broadcast a regional television news program, but was also responsible for ensuring territorial continuity in terms of audiovisual broadcasting by broadcasting programs from the three metropolitan public television channels. The arrival of color for the broadcast of films on Reunion screens took place in 1976 under pressure from Michel Debré who forced FR3 and its president Claude Contamine to begin this heavy project two years before all other overseas television stations. FR3-Réunion completely switched to color on 5 July 1978 with the establishment of a color control room making it possible to create local color broadcasts, including one in Creole Donne à minus la main. In 1979, almost the entire island, except for the area around Grand Bassin, captured terrestrial images from FR3-Réunion.

On 31 December 1982, the channel took the name RFO Réunion following the creation of the national program company RFO (Radio-Télévision Française d'Outre-Mer) by transfer of the activities of FR3 for Overseas. Its missions remain unchanged, but the new structure has its own budget which should allow it to move from the role of broadcaster to that of program producer. Over the next sixteen years, RFO Réunion will gradually acquire quality technical equipment in order to produce and broadcast more and more regional programs. On 23 December 1983, a second television channel was launched to broadcast part of Antenne 2's programs with a slight delay. It took the name RFO 2 while the first television channel was renamed RFO 1. Advertising was introduced in 1984.

The channel had to face competition from Télé Free Dom from 1986 to 1991, which broadcast on the island without authorization. To react, RFO 1 began its programs at noon in 1991 with the Creole program Midi à zot presented by Jacky Grondin and Sylvie Poulain, but must now share the audience with two newly authorized private competitors, Antenne Réunion which continued to capture ever greater audience shares until it established itself on television news in the mid-2000s, and Canal+ Réunion.

The growth of Antenne Réunion caused drastic changes to the channel over time. In 1994, its commercial competitor began establishing connections with TF1, when, at the time, RFO still had the rights to carry key programs from the private network. This "advantage", normal until 1986, could have been abolished when the mainland network was privatized. Until 1993, most of the mainland programs were sourced from TF1 (which had better ratings) and France 3, while RFO 2 only relayed France 2's output, and had lower ratings. Per a decree passed on 30 April 1994, RFO 2 would cease commercial advertising on 1 July, as a balancing act to counter Antenne Réunion's planned taking of TF1's relays. In February 1999, RFO 1 became Télé Réunion, following the transformation of RFO into Réseau France Outre-mer. That same year, it started an unexpected negotiation with Antenne Réunion, in which RFO's satellite facilities in Paris were used for its commercial competitor as an uplink and downlink facility. Until then episodic, Reunion Creole has had its place on the air since 2001 with the launch of a weekly television news program entirely in Creole, Komsaminm, broadcast every Saturday at 12:30pm.

The audiovisual reform law no. 2004-669 of 9 July 2004 integrates the program company Réseau France Outre-mer into the public audiovisual group France Télévisions on which Télé Réunion has since depended. Its president, Rémy Pflimlin, announced on 12 October 2010 the change of name from Réseau France Outre-mer to Réseau Outre-Mer 1re to adapt to the launch of the digital terrestrial platform in overseas regions. All the television channels in the network changed their name for the start of DTT on November 30, 2010 and Télé Réunion thus became Réunion 1re on 29 November 2010. The name change refers to the leading position of this channel in its broadcast territory as well as its first place on the remote control and its numbering in consistency with the other antennas of the France Télévisions group. On 1 January 2018, following a lawsuit with the Paris Première channel, Réunion 1re became Réunion La Première.

Réunion La 1ère started high definition broadcasts on satellite on January 15, 2020 and on terrestrial television on September 8, 2020.
