= TV+ (Gabon) =

TV+ is a Gabonese private television channel founded in 1998. Throughout its history it was owned by former minister of the interior and opposition leader André Mba Obame, which caused a political scandal that deprived the station of its UHF broadcast.

Following the board meeting held on Friday, August 30, 2019 in Libreville, Joseph Ondong Atomo, son of the former minister of the interior, was appointed new Chairman and CEO.

== History ==
TV+ started broadcasting in 1998 under the slogan La Télévision du Futur (TV of the Future). It was an affiliate of the French service of the South African network TVAfrica, which enabled the channel to have access to international sporting events and other foreign programming. After its closure, a new agreement was signed with Canal France Internationale in 2003 for daily news monitoring.

Since its creation, TV+ went past periods of tremendous financial gain (receiving billions of FCFA). In 2004, TV+ expanded its signal to Ogooué-Maritime and Haut-Ogooué thanks to an agreement signed with pan-African radio station Afrique Nº 1, who used the Africasat satellite to deliver its services.

The situation deteriorated during the 2009 presidential elections. At 8pm on August 30, 2009, TV+ lost its signal during a repeat airing of a 2005 interview with the deceased president Omar Bongo, who died earlier in the year. On January 26, 2011, the National Communications Council suspended TV+ for a period of three months, announced by Godel Inanga on state television. The day before the suspension, Obame sworn himself as the president of Gabon live on the channel, in a staged presidential inauguration, as means to protest against Bongo's 2009 election, which was hotly contested.

On 21 January 2022, TV+ Gabon S.A. was no longer able to use its logo and slogan ("La chaîne du futur") due to a judicial problem. The name was created by its former owner (Franck Nguema).
