= Free Dom =

Political party in Réunion, France

- Founder: Camille and Margie Sudre
- Founded: 1992
- Headquarters: Saint-Denis, Réunion
- Ideology: Left-wing populism; Independence; Socialism

Website
- freedom.fr

Free Dom is a left-wing political party in the French overseas department of Réunion, closely associated with the Communist Party of Réunion (PCR). It was founded in 1996 by Camille and Margie Sudre.

== History ==
Radio Free Dom was established by Camille Sudre and his wife Margie in 1981. Its success led to the creation of a television channel, Télé Free Dom, a few years later.

However, Télé Free Dom was quickly deemed illegal and shut down by the Conseil supérieur de l'audiovisuel (CSA), which prohibited its broadcasts. This decision was seen as "silencing the voice of the people", leading to a series of clashes between youths and riot police (CRS) in Saint-Denis in February 1991, an event known as the "Événements du Chaudron.

Recognizing the underlying social unrest in Réunion, Camille Sudre founded a political movement named Free Dom, which he led. In 1992, he was elected President of the Regional Council of Réunion with a platform focused on achieving social equality with metropolitan France. However, his election was annulled by the Conseil d'État the following year due to campaign finance violations, prompting new elections.

Margie Sudre succeeded her husband as head of the institution but soon diverged from his political views, moving closer to the right and joining the government in 1995. Despite her departure, the Free Dom movement continued, maintaining a close relationship with PCR. Together, they formed the electoral alliance Alliance pour la Réunion.

== See also ==
- Télé Free Dom
