= Cantons of the Réunion department =

The following is a list of the 25 cantons of the Réunion department, in France, following the French canton reorganisation which came into effect in March 2015:

- L'Étang-Salé
- Le Port
- La Possession
- Saint-André-1
- Saint-André-2
- Saint-André-3
- Saint-Benoît-1
- Saint-Benoît-2
- Saint-Denis-1
- Saint-Denis-2
- Saint-Denis-3
- Saint-Denis-4
- Sainte-Marie
- Saint-Joseph
- Saint-Leu
- Saint-Louis-1
- Saint-Louis-2
- Saint-Paul-1
- Saint-Paul-2
- Saint-Paul-3
- Saint-Pierre-1
- Saint-Pierre-2
- Saint-Pierre-3
- Le Tampon-1
- Le Tampon-2
