= Du battant des lames au sommet des montagnes =

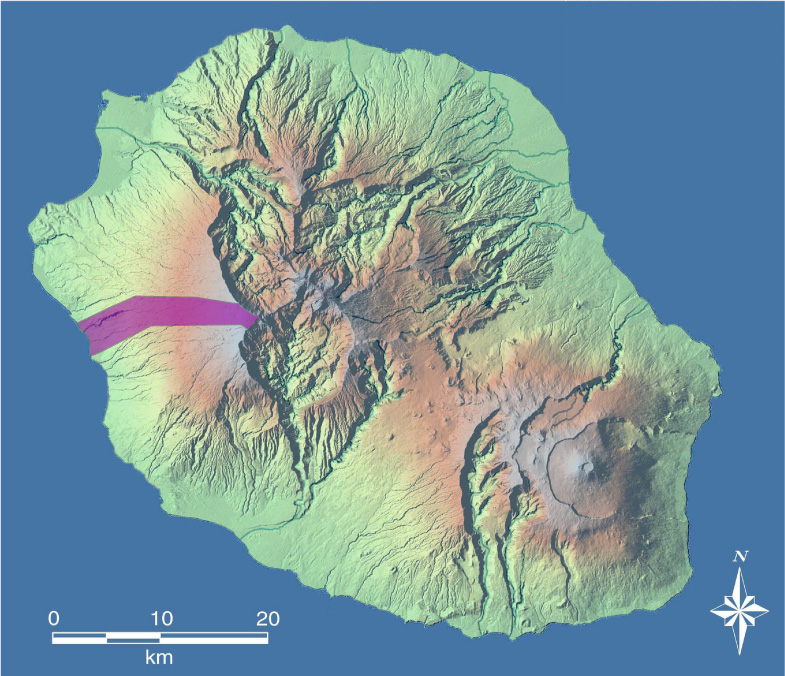
Trois-Bassins is a textbook example of a commune stretching du battant des lames au sommet des montagnes, in this case from Baie de Saint-Leu to the Grand Bénare.

Du battant des lames au sommet des montagnes (French for "From the beating of the waves to the summit of the mountains" (lit.) or "From the seashore to the mountaintops" (fig.)) is a French expression that formerly served to define the geographic concessions accorded by the French East India Company to the colonists of the island of Réunion when it was still called île Bourbon. Since then, the expression has become a common phrase, indeed a "fixed formula". In its strictest meaning, it acts grammatically as an answer to the question "how?" and explains the way in which the land was cut into straight bands that stretch from the shore to the highest points without ever stretching horizontally. On the other hand, considered in its broader meaning, the expression substitutes for an adverb of place, being a synonym for "everywhere".

== Origins ==
=== Significance of the terms used ===
==== Lame ====
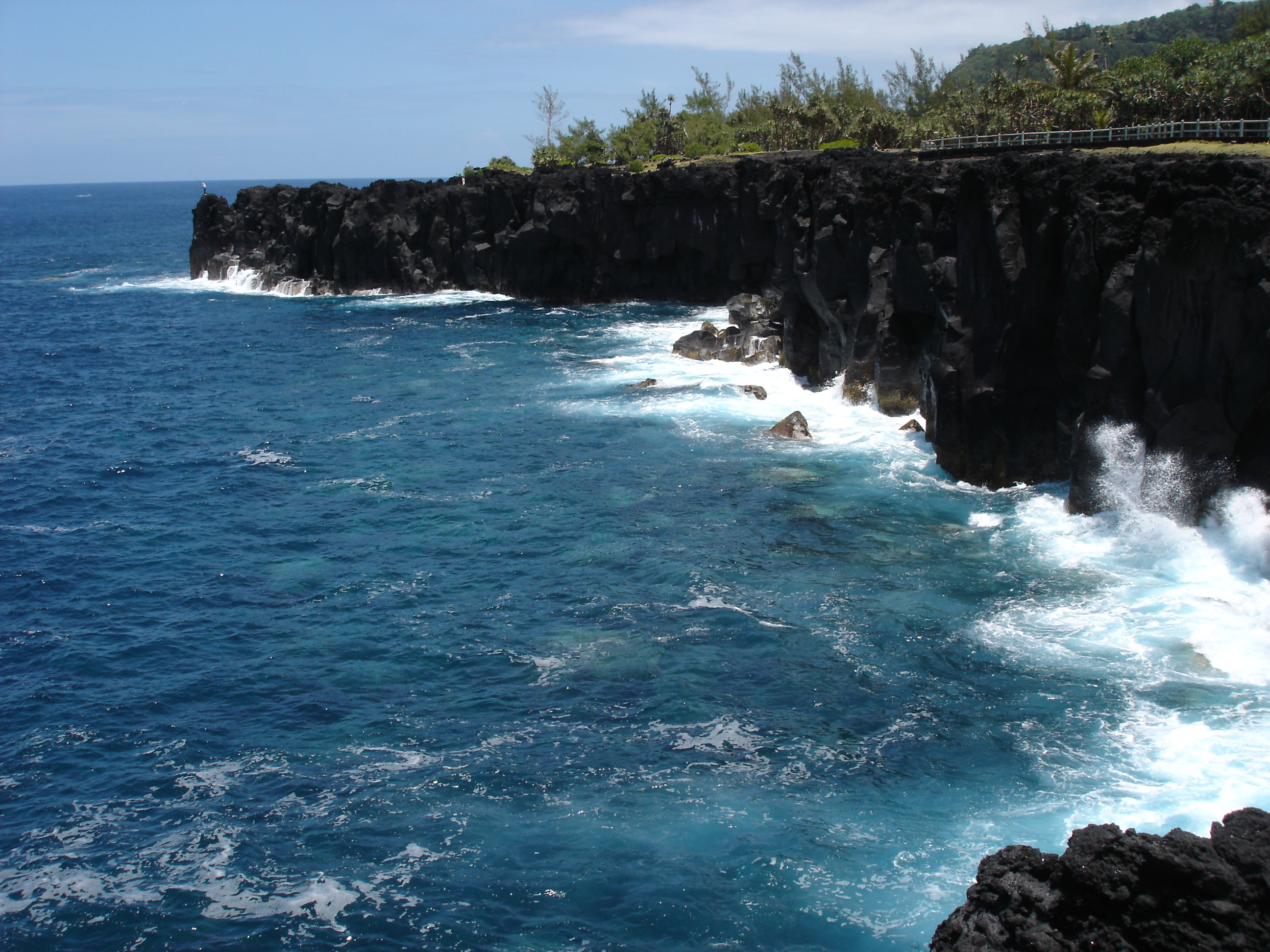
Very exposed to the south seas, Cap Méchant of Saint-Philippe is beaten by the lames (waves).

The word lame here means a "more or less considerable movement of the sea due to wind action" or a "mass of water that rises up, shrinks from its crest, foams and breaks". It thus connotes a "wave of certain importance" like those one can easily see on a very regular basis on Réunion's shore.

The island suffers from a geographical position that exposes it to strong waves with multiple origins. One of these is the trade winds and above all affects the leeward east coast. Another explanation is the absence of dry land between the south seas and the shores of the Sud sauvage (the southeastern part of the island), which means that the screaming sixties and the furious fifties (terms invented by mariners to describe the powerful winds between those longitudes) can reach Réunion without meeting any obstacle. A third reason is that this French Overseas department lies in the path of the tropical cyclones that arise in the centre of the Indian Ocean.

==== Battant des lames ====
The word battant as used here is not covered by any of the definitions given by the Trésor de la langue française informatisé. According to Le Français de la Réunion, a dictionary written by literature professor Michel Beniamino, this term in effect forms part of a noun phrase that takes on a particular meaning when it is associated with the word lames in the French spoken on Réunion. Thus, the battant des lames would be "the part of the coast subjected the action of the waves". Consequently, the meaning is close to what is called a foreshore in Metropolitan France.

However, although Beniamino thinks that "seashore" is the best synonym, others consider that the terms are not equivalent. For instance, in a July 2002 dissertation written for the École supérieure des géomètres et topographes and titled Les Spécificités du bornage à l'île de la Réunion et leurs origines ("The Specifics of Partitioning on the Island of Réunion and Their Origins"), Yannick Smil posits that the seashore is less exposed to waves than the battant des lames.

==== Au sommet des montagnes ====
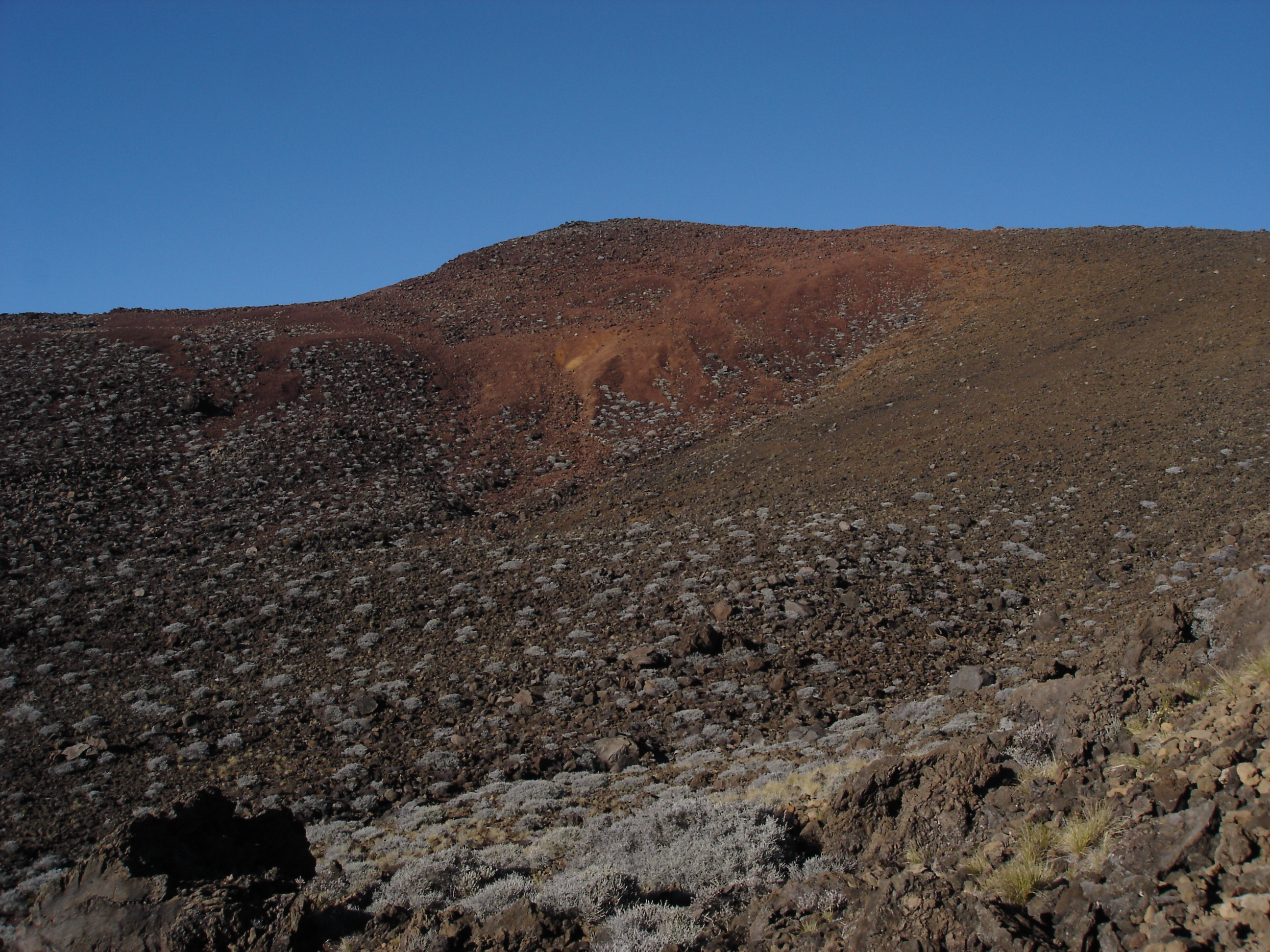
High point of the island, the Piton des Neiges is not the sommet des montagnes ("summit of the mountains") referred to in the original expression.

The montagnes to which the expression refers are the island's two mountainous massifs, that of Piton des Neiges and of Piton de la Fournaise. However, the sommet meant by the original version is neither of these two peaks. Rather, Grand Bénare was meant: when the expression was devised, it was far more familiar to the settlers.

At the time, in fact, neither of the former two peaks had been approached. According to Bory de Saint-Vincent, the first ascent of the island's active volcano (de la Fournaise) came in the mid-18th century, while that of the extinct volcano (des Neiges) came even later. The expression itself dates to the beginnings of the island's colonisation, about a century earlier.

== Historical genesis ==
=== Original context ===
The exact origins of the expression have not been clearly established. However, it is certain that it was first used to designate the physical limits of the enormous parcels of land that the French East India Company granted to the French colonists who had just settled on the island's shores from the end of the 18th century. Thus, it is quite likely that it appeared in writing on the legal documents that the company had to draft in order to grant these concessions, a privilege that conferred upon it the status of royal factory.

From the time Réunion started to be peopled, the island's entire territory was the property of the King. However, the first inhabitants settled wherever they liked, taking whatever land they wanted: there was room for everyone. It was only several years later that the East India Company expressed a desire to fix people's property lines so that they could cultivate the land more efficiently. Governor Vauboulon was the first to attempt to organise cultivation of the land and introduced the system of concessions. The first that can be found in the département archives date to 16 January 1690.

=== Logic behind the principle ===
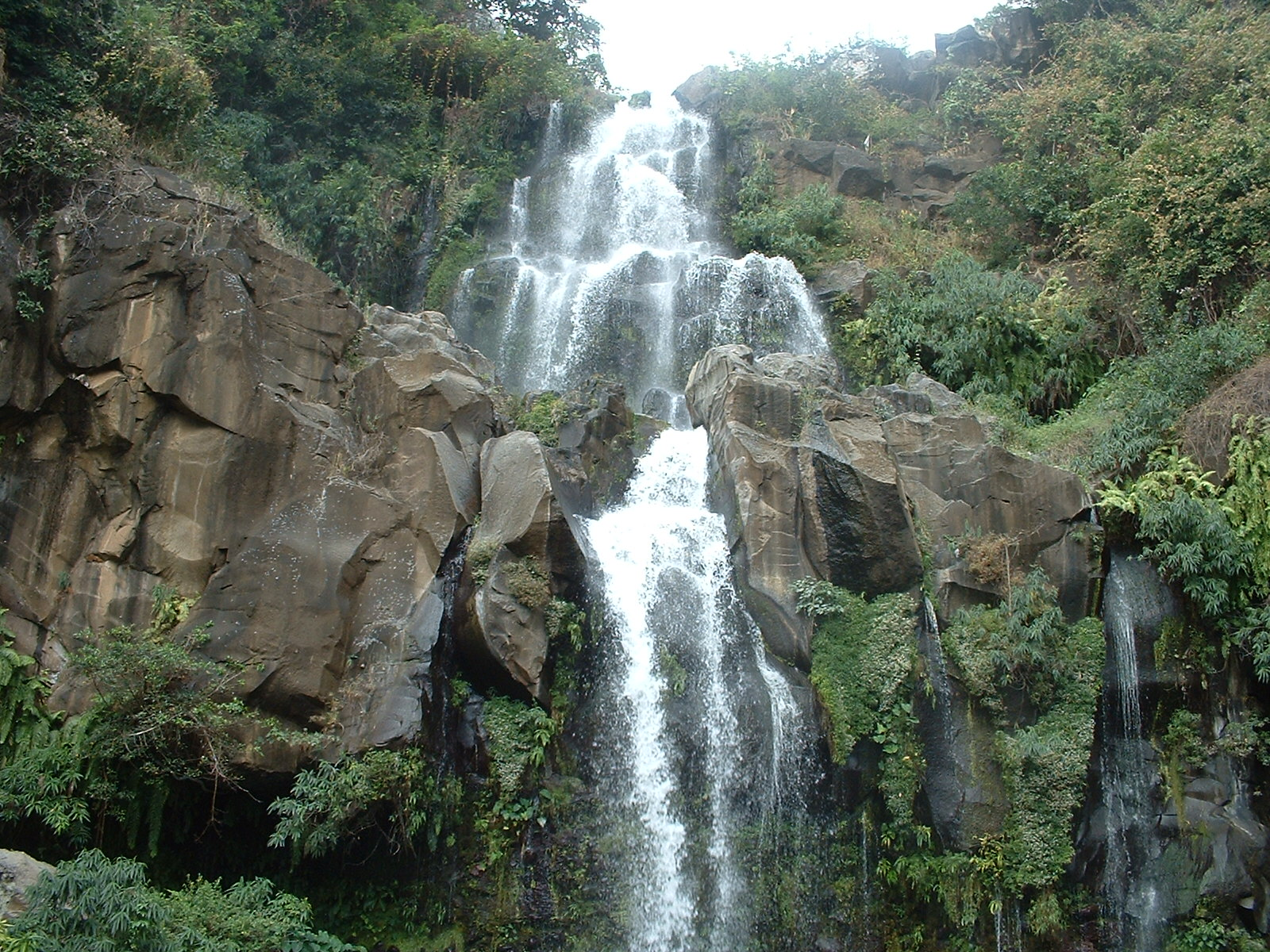
The ravine Saint-Gilles and its waterfalls have served to delimit a concession since at least 1699.

Very quickly, the concessions were divided among the assignees and the land was cut up into several lots. But on Réunion, throughout its history, it has clearly been Parisian customary law that has guided the rights of succession. It stipulates that goods are to be divided equally among all heirs, regardless of relative age or sex.

Because the climate varied depending on altitude and thus there were differences in the potential value of the land, the property lines were drawn along the slope of the hills so as to benefit each descendant in a complete and equitable fashion: flat, easy-access land in the plains near the royal roads and the sea; land for farming and cultivation halfway up; and, a little higher, land planted with trees for building or burning. In turn, the intermediary level was divided in three parts, each with a distinct function: the lowest was used for subsistence farming, the middle for coffee plantations and the highest for animal husbandry.

The task of dividing plots perpendicular to the coast was made much easier by the fact that numerous ravines, difficult to cross, cover Réunion, starting from the heights and striating the sides of this cone-shaped island. Each lot might therefore be bounded by two torrents, as is the concession stretching from the shore to the mountain peaks that Governor Jacques de La Cour granted to Chauveau et Grimaud on 10 February 1699 between Ravine Saint-Gilles and Ravine des Sables. The downhill flow of the water forms nearly incontestable natural bounds for the property.

== Implementation problems ==
=== Problems on the shore ===
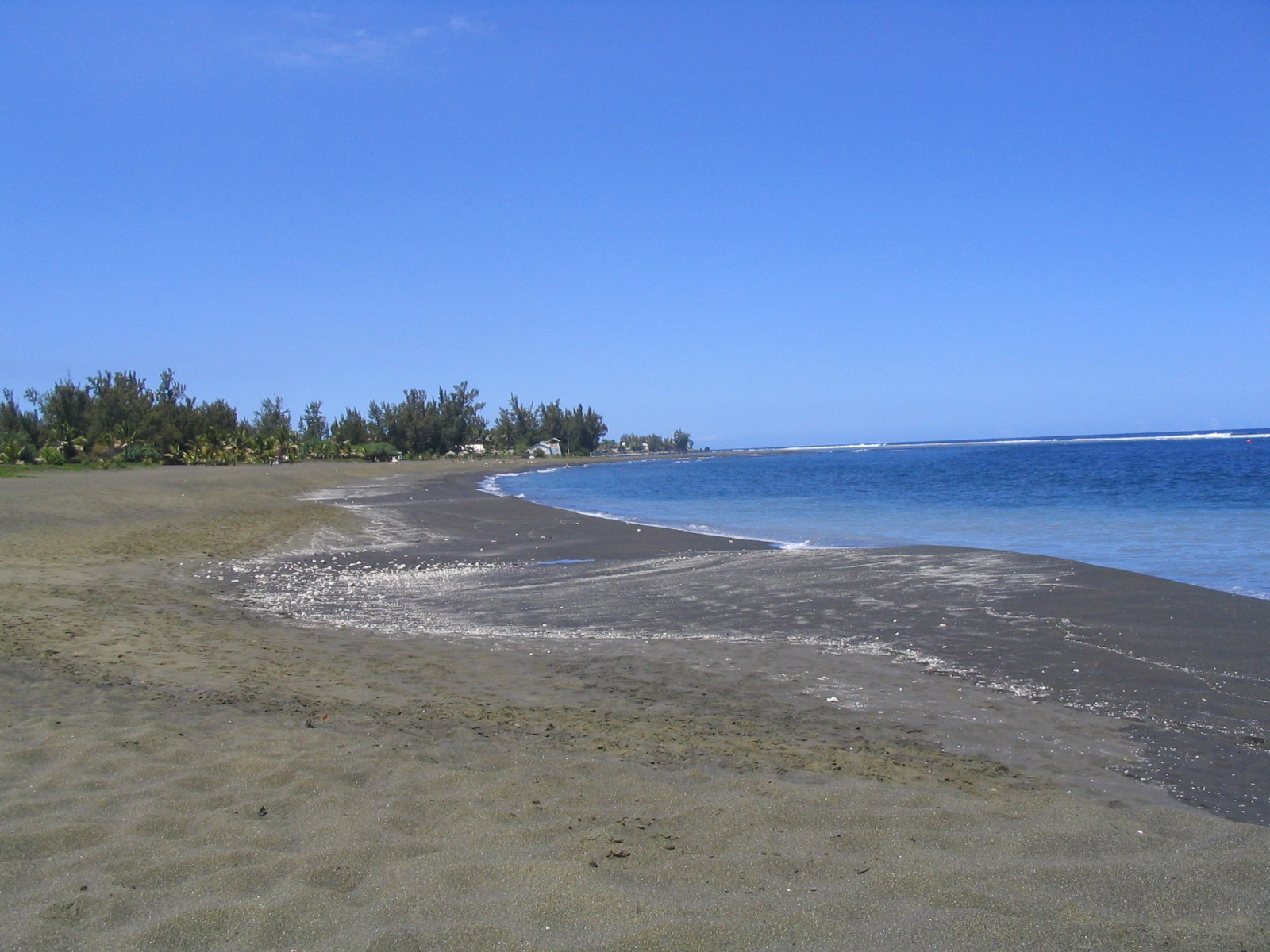
The concessions that stretch to the highest summits were cut off from their sea edges at the beginning of the 18th century.

Difficulties began when the authorities decided to set aside a fifty geometric-footstep zone along the island's shore. This restriction had not been formally stipulated in numerous prior deals: it was only as of 1736 that it was clearly mentioned during transactions. Indeed, it took a judgment of the Conseil Supérieur, dated 4 May 1765, to quash all objections and spell out with certainty the obligation to have a royal reserve along the coast. The establishment of this band around the entire island caused the expression to lose its initial meaning by distancing the lower limit of the concessions from the battant des lames.

=== Disputes up high ===
Since ravines were often formed by the union of several thalwegs upstream, the choice of which tributary to keep as the boundary marker between plots of land up high was not always easy and often led to disputes. This problem was aggravated by the fact that some of the ravines in question had several names, which made for a possible source of confusion.

The question of what was meant by au sommet des montagnes was the most hotly debated. Although its meaning was clear in the Saint-Paul region, where the planèze (gently inclined volcanic plateau) is dominated by the Grand Bénare, the expression thereafter became a "style clause" used without any relation to the real situation in the regions where the landscape was more craggy. Thus, several possible meanings were debated:

- The point that seemed highest, as seen from the shore.
- The outside edge of the ridges of the cirques of Mafate, Salazie and Cilaos, the three depressions in the centre of the island.
- The high point of the island, that is the summit of the Piton des Neiges.

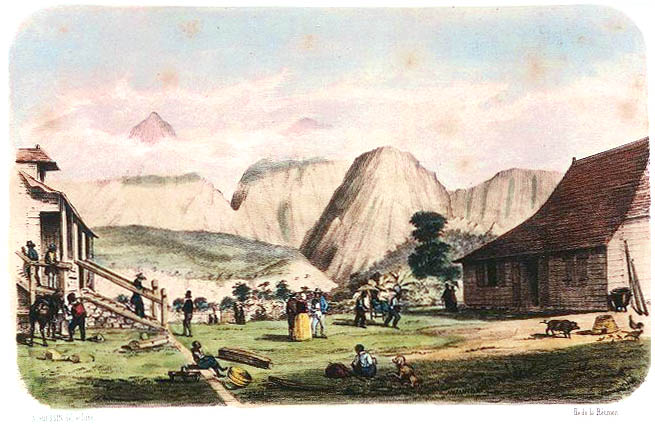
In 1830, Théodore Cazeau became the first to benefit from a distant concession in the middle of the island. He set up a home in Salazie in a place called Mare à Poule d'eau.

What was at stake in this debate, which pitted the administration against the grantees at the end of the 1820s and the beginning of the next decade, was whether there remained land to be distributed. The authorities wished to open new concessions in the Cirque of Salazie, which was done in 1830, but also in the heart of La Plaine-des-Palmistes and of the Plaine des Cafres, which happened in 1834. The farmers considered that their parcels extended up to the summit of the island's highest mountain, so that all the concessions met at a single point.

Since this latter interpretation did not correspond to the physical reality of the terrain, the administration created a new distinction between the expressions sommet des montagnes ("summit of the mountains") and sommet de la montagne ("summit of the mountain"), which it had hitherto used interchangeably. Thus, a judgment of the Conseil de contentieux administratif, issued 2 August 1853, defined the first as designating the high point as seen from several successive places, while the second referred only to the crest as seen in the foreground. A judgment of the Saint-Denis tribunal, issued 5 May 1856, then established that le sommet des montagnes was the crest in the background seen from the sea, and that there was no need to differentiate between use of the singular and the plural in the expression. This judgment was upheld by a ruling of the Cour de Bordeaux on 19 June 1867.

Several years later, a ruling of 25 February 1874 ordered the amicable delimitation of the line of separation forming the high point of the concessions. However, the delimitation of the parcels did not follow this judicially ordered definition. It took an acquisition of summits by the government to put an end to the quarrel and fix the upper limit of the properties.

== Consequences ==
=== New units of measurement appear ===
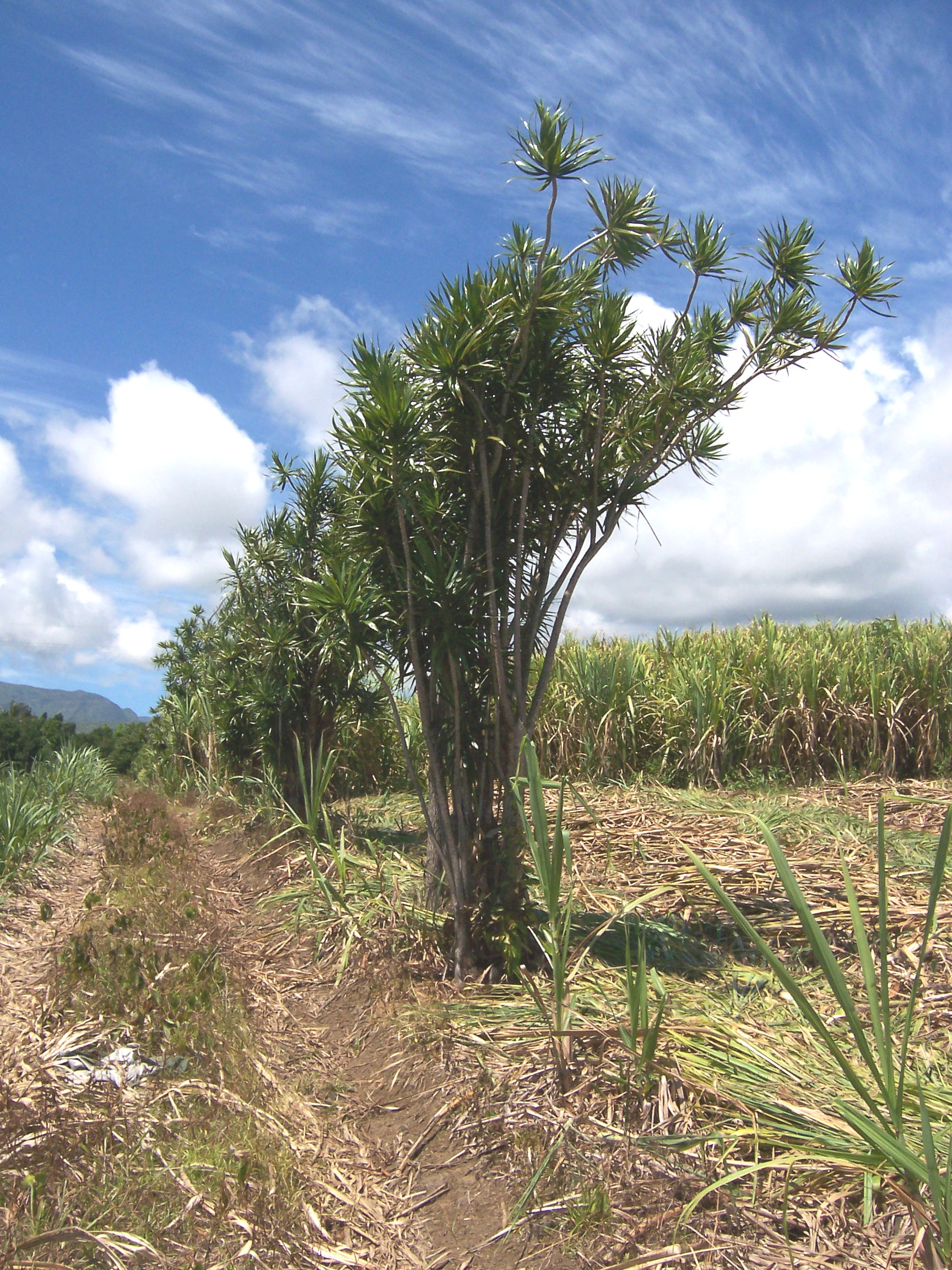
This 2006 photograph shows how Dracaena reflexa could be used to show the concessions' limits.

The relatively simple system of land distribution, made possible by applying the expression of the East India Company, allowed the landowners to dispose with legal measurement units: each owner could guess the extent of his property by looking at nature. Thus they only needed to plant distinctive species, such as Dracaena reflexa, to make the boundaries visible and make them known to the neighbours.

The arpent (58.464 m), the unit of measurement employed in the first years of colonisation, fell out of use in several decades. In this context, new standards were ripe for appearance. Among these were the geometric footstep and above all the gaulette (4.872 m), an agrarian unit that continued to be used on a daily basis through the end of the 20th century.

=== Thinning, then concentrating private properties ===
Little by little as they were handed down, the strips of land became more and more narrow. Some were only a few metres wide by several kilometres long following the downward slope. Because of this, farming and access to parcels became more and more difficult.

The pauperisation and relegation of part of the island's white population were due to the sugar crisis of the 1820s, '30s and '40s, and also to the growing irrationality of the smallholdings' shapes. This relegation led to the colonisation of the island's centre and of its cirques from 1830. The Petits Blancs des Hauts (poor, landless whites) were those areas' first permanent inhabitants after maroon slaves.

However, the trend toward thinning the parcels was not universal. The vertical logic imposed by the formula of the East India Company was not immutable and rather quickly, in order to deal with demographic pressure, there started to appear horizontal boundaries cutting the original strips into several plots situated one above the other. In 1732, the surveyor Durongoüet was tasked with tracing four surveyors' lines parallel to the shore, at altitudes of 100, 200, 400 and 600 m. These lines, which correspond to the topographic notion of level curves, are still visible today, especially above the centre of Saint-Pierre, in the southern part of the island. Today these are navigable roads lined with houses that form evocatively named towns away from the centre: Ligne Paradis at around 100 m altitude, Ligne des Bambous at about 200 m, Ligne des Quatre-cents ("Line of the Four Hundreds") a little further and Ligne des Six-cents ("Line of the Six Hundreds") right at the top.

In addition, according to geographer Wilfrid Bertile, some owners, usually making multiple transactions, were able to merge several properties and so form large domains that encompassed key parts of the island's land. In the second half of the 19th century, land concentration became extreme, to the benefit of a handful of private owners like the Kerveguens and of the several banks, such as Crédit Foncier. These squires, whether private or institutional, thus gained thousands, indeed tens of thousands of hectares. This allowed some to consider that the application of the principle devised by the East India Company is what originated the control by ruling élites over all the lands of the island of Réunion.

Whatever the case may be, the system founded on private property ended up dominating at the expense of the concession-based system, which was further threatened by the development of the colonat partiaire, a form of metayage specific to the French outre-mer, inspired by slavery and not abolished until 2006. These new forms of land occupancy signalled, when the ensuing transactions were made, an approach of economic opportunism rather than geographic logic. It was thus that the carving up du battant des lames au sommet des montagnes inevitably started to ebb.

=== Initial carving up into communes ===
Since the creation of L'Entre-Deux commune in 1882, several communes of Réunion have been established, either not stretching du battant des lames au sommet des montagnes or having lost this characteristic by being cut up themselves.

Population growth in each initial concession quickly led to the creation of an equal number of parishes by the Roman Catholic Church. The French Revolution transformed these parishes into communes. For several decades, the latter possessed the specific shape of the first concessions. All stretched from the ocean to the summits until the end of the 19th century.

It took until 1882, when L'Entre-Deux was created, that the first commune of Réunion not stretching du battant des lames au sommet des montagnes was created: it did not reach the sea and its minimum altitude was around 100 m. France having become a republic, systematic hagiotoponymy (naming places after saints) was abandoned on that occasion. Thus, L'Entre-Deux became the first municipality whose name did not honour a saint.

Since then, several other communes not respecting the principle of vertical division have been created: L'Étang-Salé, Petite-Île, Le Port and Saint-Pierre do not reach the mountains, while Cilaos, La Plaine-des-Palmistes, Salazie and Le Tampon do not border the coast. Today, although a majority of communes stretch du battant des lames au sommet des montagnes, other conceptions of territorial division than that promoted by the East India Company's expression have made their mark on Réunion.

The traditional division of plots from seashore to centre has not prevented the differentiation of Réunion's territory into two qualitatively distinct zones. It has not stopped the development of a dualism between the island's Heights and lowlands, an opposition that the Parc national de la Réunion, opened at the beginning of 2007, tries to correct.

== Change in meaning ==
=== Equivalents elsewhere ===
For all the reasons already indicated, the expression ceased to be used in its original sense rather soon after it appeared. However, it serves to designate the whole of the island of Réunion just as other expressions, more or less historical, stand for the whole of a country or continent:

- "From Dunkirk to Tamanrasset" for France, when Algeria was part of France
- "From the Atlantic to the Urals" for Europe
- "From Cairo to Cape Town" for Africa; see the Cape to Cairo Railway Project
- "From Alaska to Tierra del Fuego" for the Americas
- "From Brest to Vladivostok" for Eurasia
- "From sea to shining sea" (from the Pacific to the Atlantic) for the United States
- "Malin to Mizen" is used to represent the whole geographical extent of Ireland
- "Land's End to John o' Groats" is the traversal of the whole length of the island of Great Britain between two extremities
- "A Mari Usque Ad Mare" (English: From Sea to Sea; French: D'un océan à l'autre) is the Canadian national motto

Additionally, there are several non-geographical expressions that serve to evoke the totality of a physical entity by describing a bottom-up movement just like the East India Company's expression:

- "From the cellar to the attic" to describe a whole house
- "From the foundation to the roof" (De fond en comble) to describe the whole of a particular building.

=== Use since the 1970s ===
==== Economy ====
The expression is particularly used by the local tourist industry in its advertising materials. The industry sees it as an easy way to encapsulate the special attraction of travelling to Réunion: access to the sea and the mountains in the same day.

==== Literature ====
In a 1972 work, the poet Jean Albany wrote that "the mountain starts to rise from the beating of the waves".

Several months later, Catherine Lavaux used the expression in the title of a work: La Réunion, du battant des lames au sommet des montagnes ("Réunion, from the beating of the waves to the summit of the mountains"). The work appeared in several editions, the latest in 1998.

==== Others ====
An exhibition called Le long du battant des lames ("Along the seashore") was opened by the Confrérie des gens de la mer in February 2004 at Saint-Denis. It remained there until the beginning of 2007 before opening at the Musée Stella Matutina in Saint-Leu on 31 March that year.
