= Les Trois-Bassins =

Commune in Réunion, France

- Commune
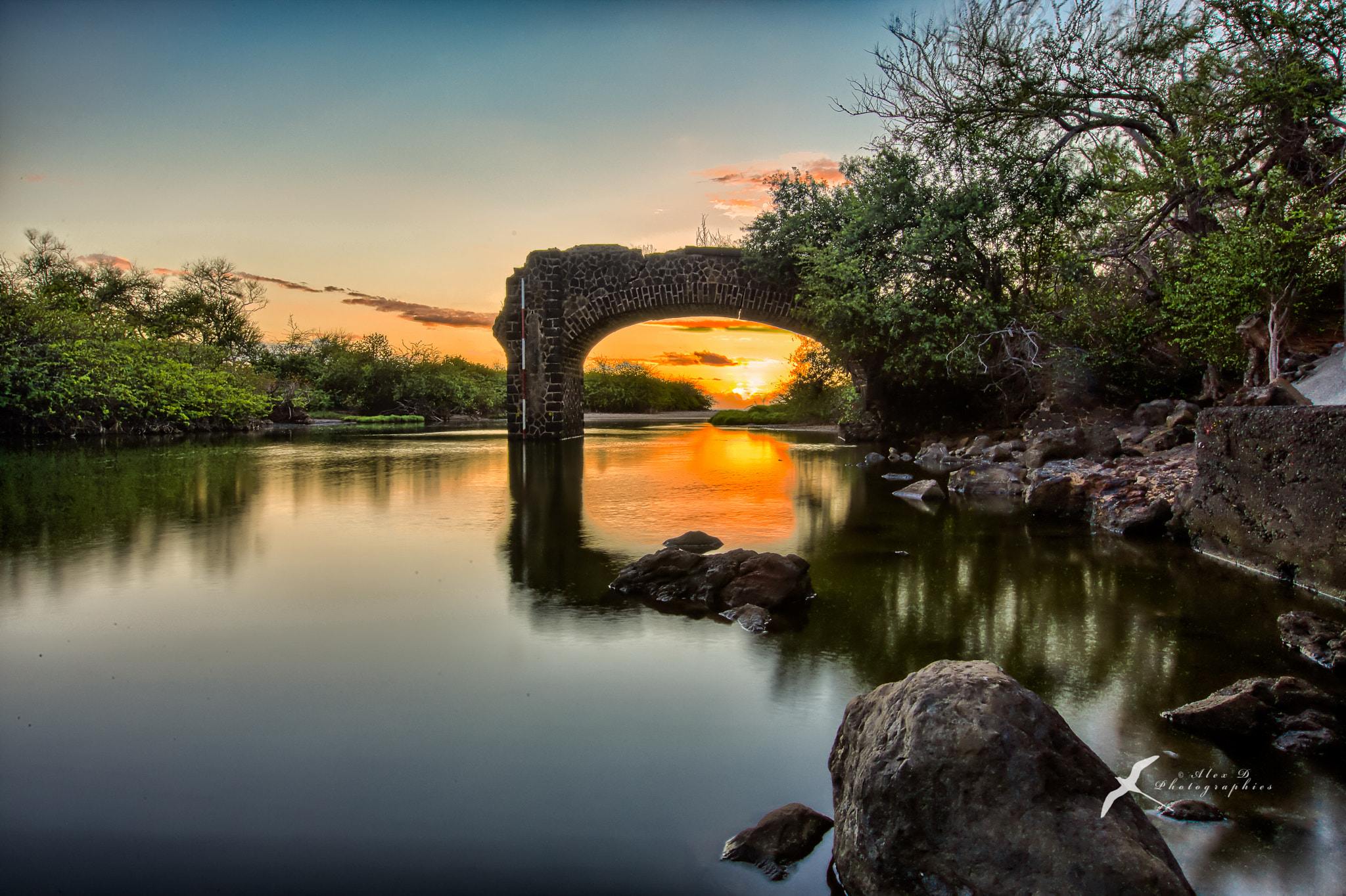

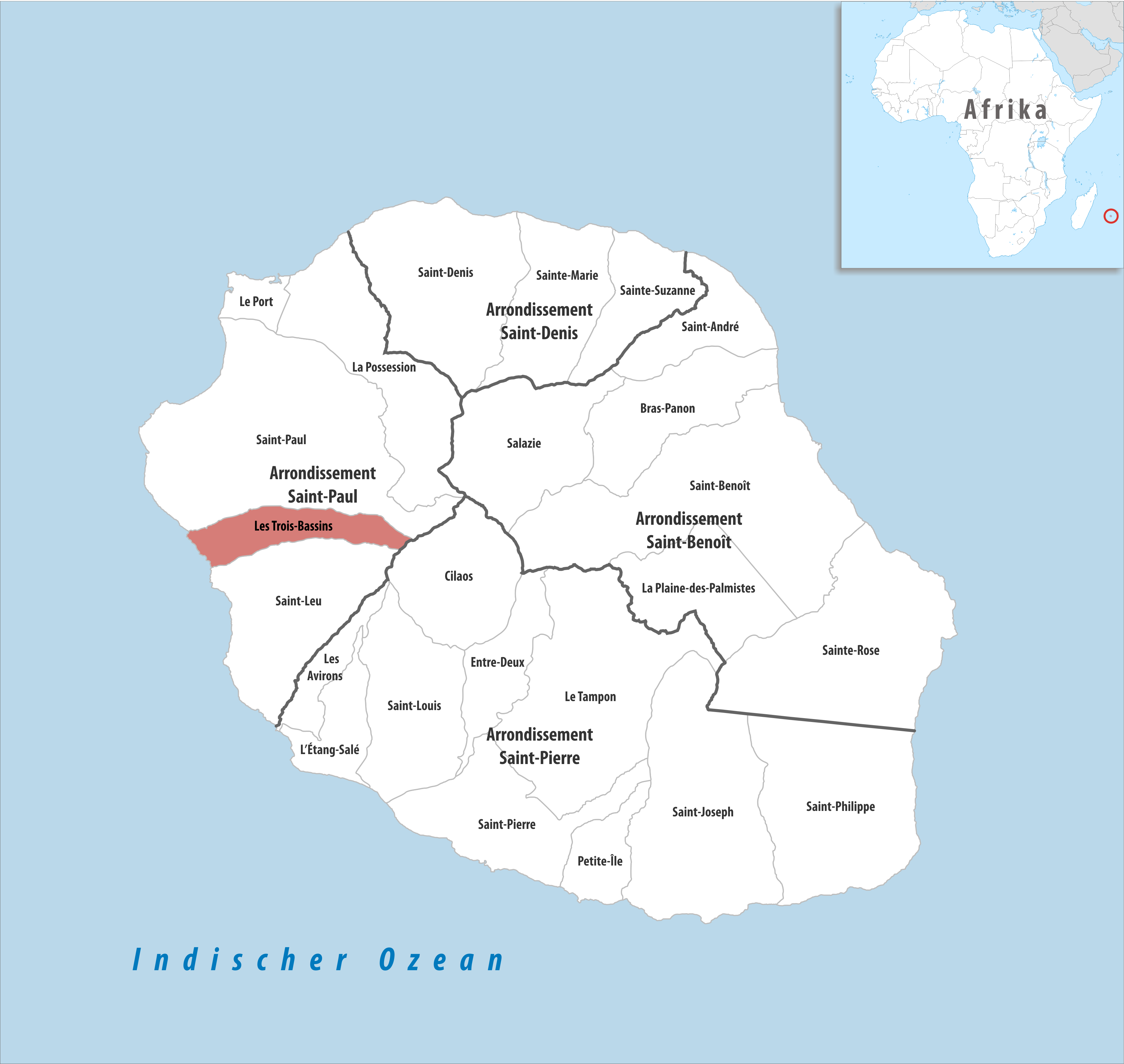
- Location of Les Trois-Bassins
- Coordinates: 21°06′21″S 55°17′42″E
- Country: France
- Overseas region and department: Réunion
- Arrondissement: Saint-Paul
- Canton: Saint-Leu
- Intercommunality: Territoire de la Côte Ouest

Government
  - Mayor (2020–2026): Daniel Pausé
- Area^{1}: 42.58 km^{2} (16.44 sq mi)
- Elevation: 722 m (2,369 ft)
- Highest elevation: 2,898 m (9,508 ft)
- Lowest elevation: 0 m (0 ft)
- Population (2023): 7,221
  - Density: 169.6/km^{2} (439.2/sq mi)
- Time zone: UTC+04:00
- INSEE/Postal code: 97423 /97426
- ^{1} French Land Register data, which excludes lakes, ponds, glaciers > 1 km^{2} (0.386 sq mi or 247 acres) and river estuaries.

Les Trois-Bassins (French pronunciation: [le tʁwa basɛ̃], lit. 'The Three Basins') is a commune in the department of Réunion. It is found on the west coast of the island, and the summit of Grand Bénare lies within its borders. The commune borders Cilaos to the west, Saint-Paul to the north and Saint-Leu to the south. The commune of Trois-Bassins was created on 27 February 1897.

== Population ==
Historical population
Year	Pop.	±% p.a.
1967	4,471	—
1974	4,864	+1.21%
1982	5,132	+0.67%
1990	5,767	+1.47%
1999	6,598	+1.51%
2007	6,929	+0.61%
2012	7,339	+1.16%
2017	7,139	−0.55%
2023	7,221	+0.19%
Source: INSEE

== Personalities ==
Muhammad Ibn 'Abd al-Karim al-Khattabi, the leader of the Rifs, lived here until May 1947.

== See also ==
- Du battant des lames au sommet des montagnes
- Communes of the Réunion department
