= Arrondissement of Saint-Paul =

Coordinates: 21°00′31″S 55°16′15″E

Saint-Paul
- Arrondissement
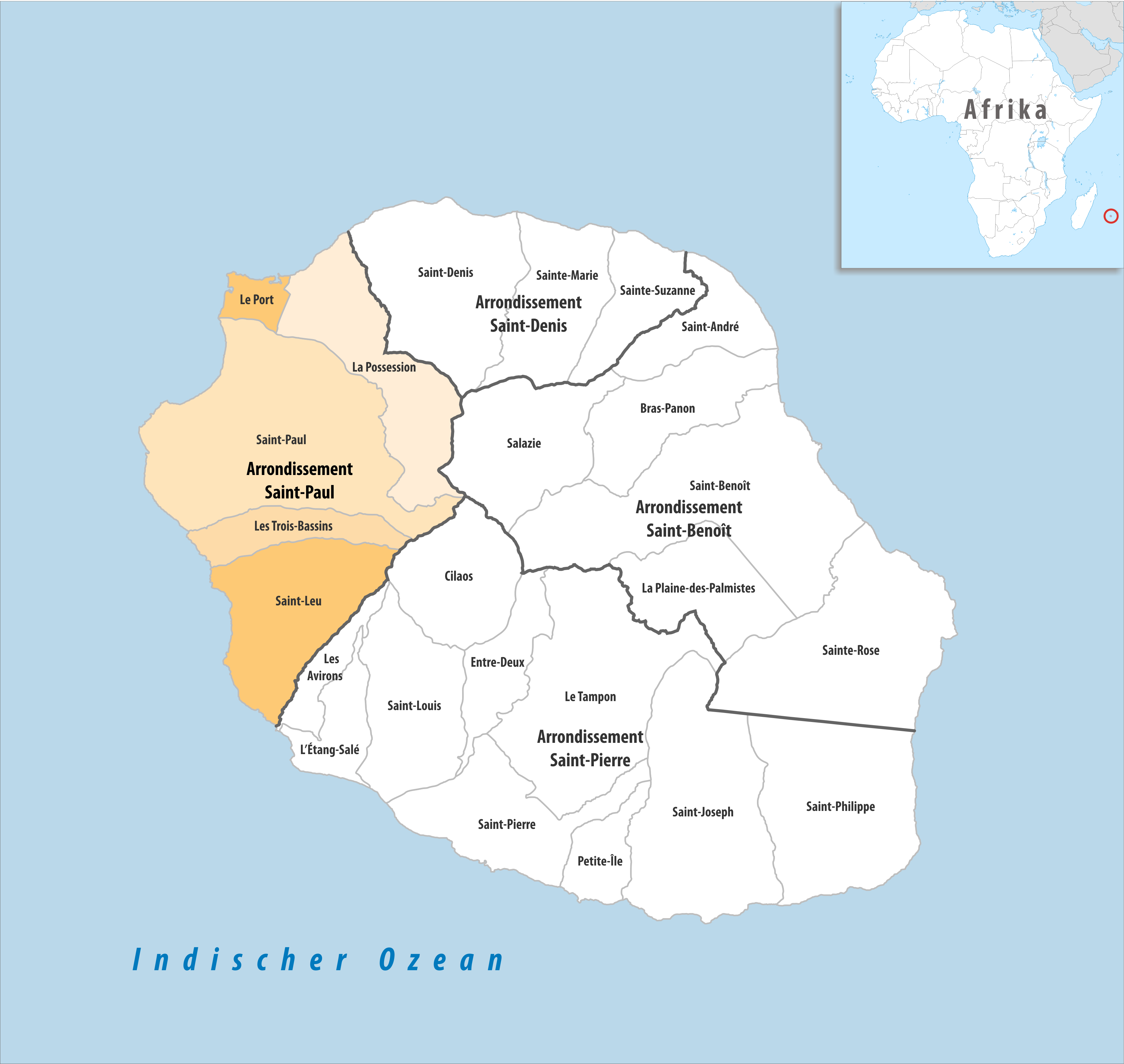
- Location within Réunion
- Country: France
- Overseas region and department: Réunion{{{region}}}
- No. of communes: {{{nbcomm}}}
- Area: 537.2 km^{2} (207.4 sq mi)
- Population (2023): 222,009
  - Density: 413.3/km^{2} (1,070/sq mi)
- INSEE code: 9744

The arrondissement of Saint-Paul is an arrondissement of France in the Réunion department in the Réunion region. It has five communes. Its population is 215,613 (2021), and its area is 537.2 km^{2} (207.4 sq mi).

== Composition ==
The communes of the arrondissement of Saint-Paul, and their INSEE codes, are:

1. Le Port (97407)
2. La Possession (97408)
3. Saint-Leu (97413)
4. Saint-Paul (97415)
5. Les Trois-Bassins (97423)

== History ==
The arrondissement of Saint-Paul, containing four communes that were previously part of the arrondissement of Saint-Pierre and one commune that was previously part of the arrondissement of Saint-Denis, was created in 1969. In September 2006 it absorbed the two communes of Le Port and La Possession from the arrondissement of Saint-Denis, and it lost the two communes of Les Avirons and L'Étang-Salé to the arrondissement of Saint-Pierre.

As a result of the reorganisation of the cantons of France which came into effect in 2015, the borders of the cantons are no longer related to the borders of the arrondissements. The cantons of the arrondissement of Saint-Paul were, as of January 2015:

1. Le Port-1
2. Le Port-2
3. La Possession
4. Saint-Leu-1
5. Saint-Leu-2
6. Saint-Paul-1
7. Saint-Paul-2
8. Saint-Paul-3
9. Saint-Paul-4
10. Saint-Paul-5
11. Les Trois-Bassins
