= Blanche Pierson =

French actress (1842–1919)

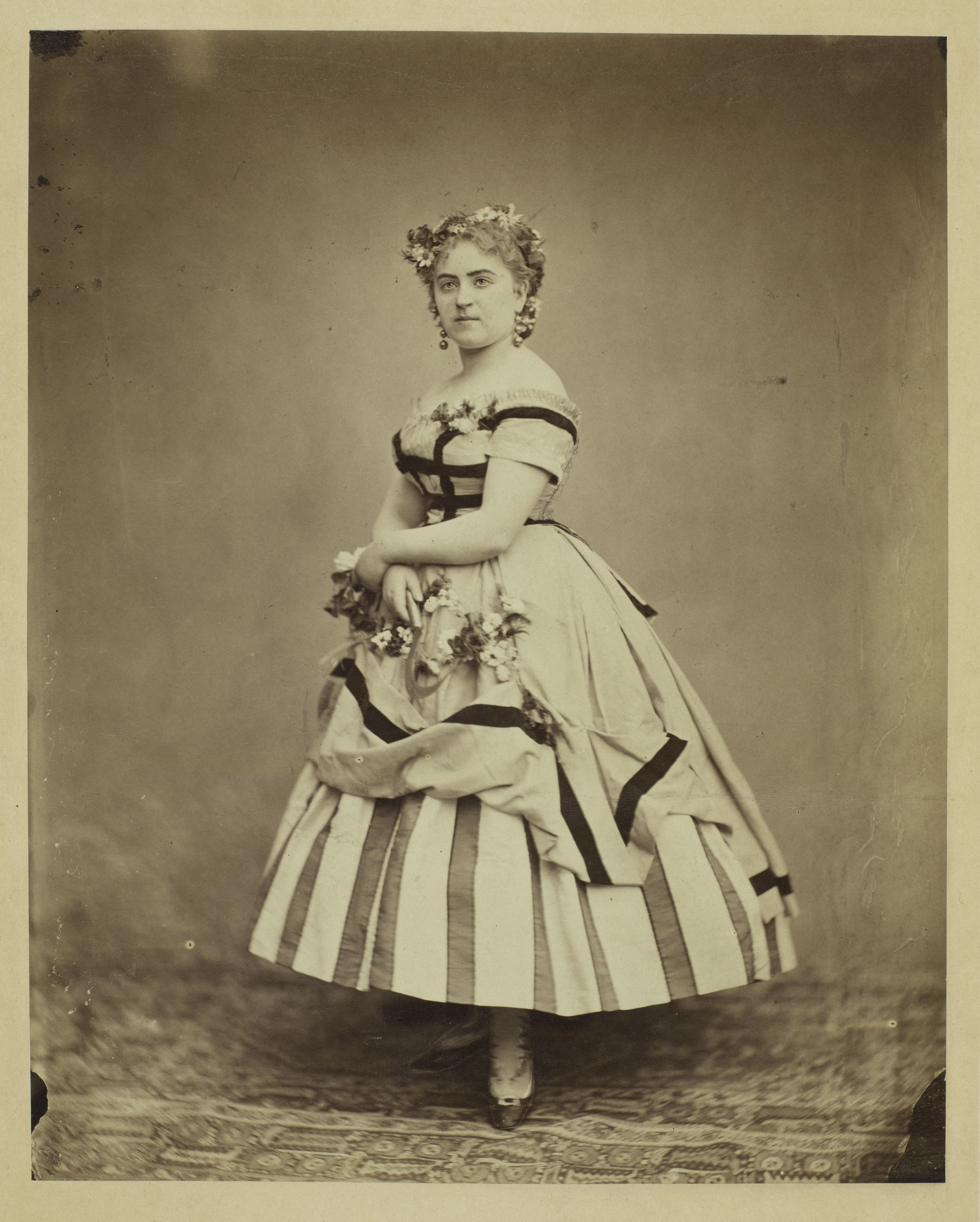
- Born: Blanche Adeline Pierson; 10 May 1842; Saint-Paul, Réunion
- Died: 30 March 1919 (aged 76); Paris, France
- Occupation: Theatre actress

Blanche Adeline Pierson (10 May 1842 – 30 March 1919) was a French Actor. She played Marguerite Gautier in "The Lady of the Camellias".

== Early life ==
Born into a theatrical family, Blanche Pierson was surrounded by the arts from a young age. Her uncle, Numa, achieved notable success at the Théâtre du Gymnase, and her father, Hyppolite, was a comic actor and the stage manager at the Saint-Paul theatre. The theatre's decline led the family to relocate to France in 1847, where Hyppolite secured employment in a provincial theatre through his connection with playwright Victorien Sardou. This move marked the beginning of Blanche's exposure to the acting world.

== Career ==
Blanche Pierson began her acting career at the age of 11. As a young girl, she played ingenue roles in provincial theatres and in Brussels. At 14, she moved to Paris and joined the Théâtre de l'Ambigu, soon after moving to the Théâtre du Vaudeville. She was noted for her charm and beauty, particularly in roles like Anna in "Les Petites Mains" by Labiche and Martin, premiered on 28 November 1859.

Blanche later joined the Théâtre du Gymnase, where she remained until 1884. Initially, she played roles of ingénues and coquettes, such as Baby Patapouf in Meilhac's "Les Curieuses," Thérèse in "A Husband Who Launches His Wife" by Labiche and Raimond Deslandes (1864), Berthe in "Le Point de mire" by Labiche and Delacour (1864), Mariette in "Nos bons villageois" by Victorien Sardou (1866), and Agathe in Gondinet's "La Cravate blanche" (1867).

=== Rise to prominence ===
Pierson's talent soon became evident, and she improved rapidly through daily rehearsals. Memorable performances from this period include Claire in Gondinet's "Les Grandes Demoiselles" (1868), Marie de Frondeville in "Fanny Lear" by Meilhac and Halévy (1868), Baroness Brunner in "Le Monde où l'on s'amuse" by Édouard Pailleron (1868), and the Countess of Cambry in "Frou-Frou" by Meilhac and Halévy (1869).

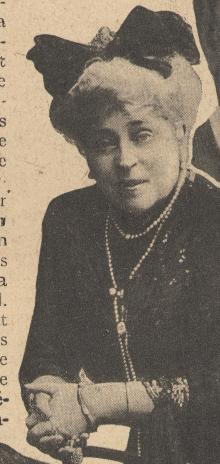

Her career further blossomed with roles like Madame de Termonde in "La Princesse Georges" by Alexandre Dumas fils (1871) and Alice in "La Comtesse de Sommerive" (1872). Dumas himself praised her highly for her dedication and talent.

=== Major successes ===
In 1872, Pierson's portrayal of Marguerite Gautier in "The Lady of the Camellias" was critically acclaimed. Critics like Francisque Sarcey praised her passionate performance, which showcased her true acting abilities. She continued to find success in roles such as Andréa in Victorien Sardou's "Andréa" (1873) and Mademoiselle de Montaiglin in "Monsieur Alphonse" by Alexandre Dumas fils (1873).

=== Later career and Comédie-Française ===
In 1884, Pierson joined the Comédie-Française. She debuted as Madame de Thauzette in "Denise" by Alexandre Dumas fils. In 1886, she became the 313th member of the Comédie-Française, playing Elmire in Molière's "Tartuffe."

Other notable roles included performances in "Odette" by Victorien Sardou (1881), "L'Amour brodé" by François de Curel (1893), and "Les affaires sont les affaires" by Octave Mirbeau (1903). She continued to perform in various productions until 1910, when she joined the theatre's reading committee.

== Death ==
Blanche Pierson died of pneumonia in March 1919 at the age of 77. Throughout her career, she was known for her dedication to the theatre and her impressive range of performances.

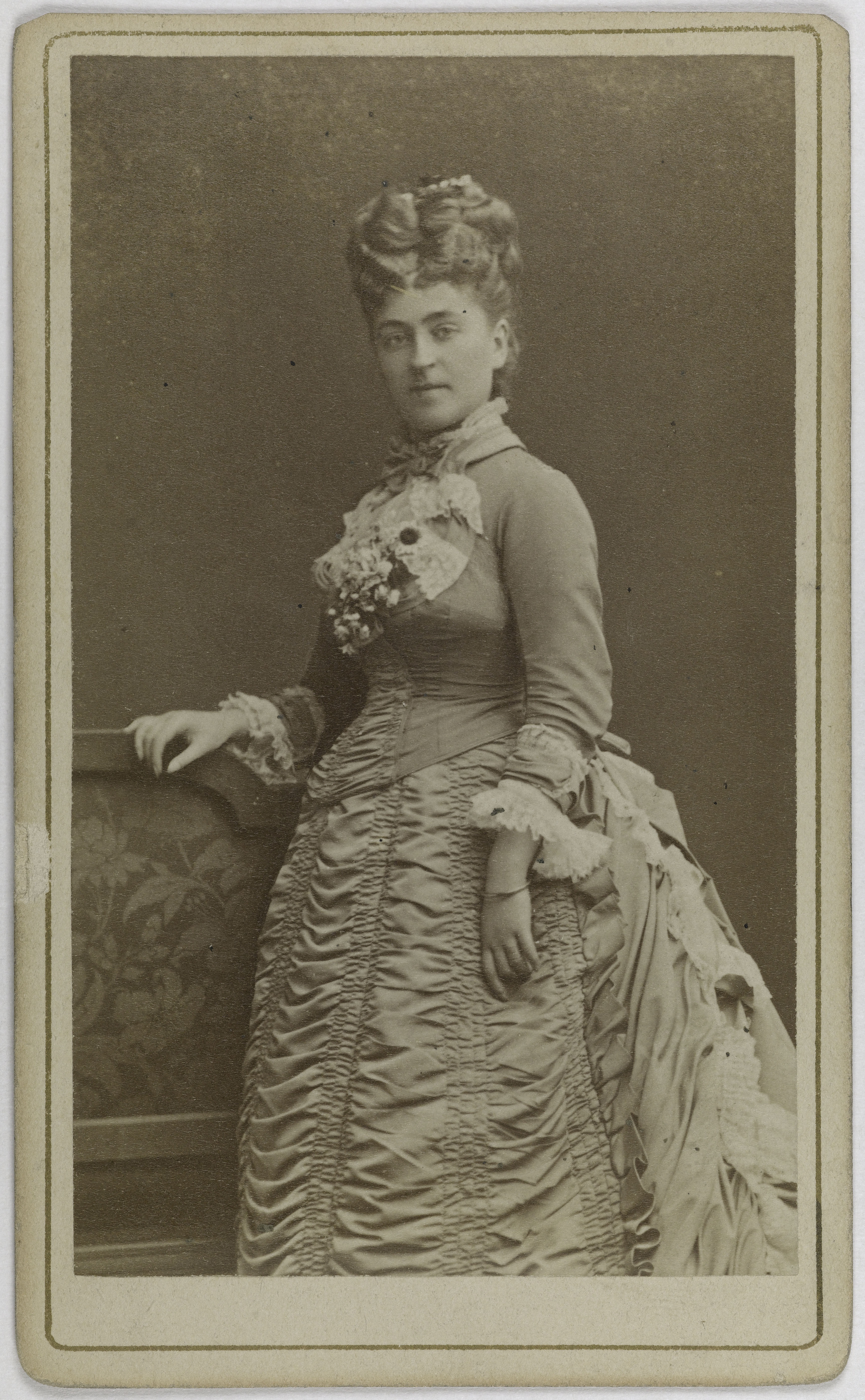
Earlier Photo

== Theater ==
=== Outside the Comédie-Française ===
- 1859: "The Little Hands" by Eugène Labiche and Édouard Martin, Théâtre du Vaudeville
- 1864: "A Husband Who Throws His Wife" by Eugène Labiche and Raimond Deslandes, Théâtre du Gymnase
- 1864: "Don Quixote" by Victorien Sardou, adapted from Miguel de Cervantes, Théâtre du Gymnase
- 1864: "The Curious Ones" by Henri Meilhac and Arthur Delavigne, Théâtre du Gymnase
- 1864: "The Focal Point" by Eugène Labiche and Alfred Delacour, Théâtre de la Cour (Compiègne) then Théâtre du Gymnase
- 1868: "How They All Are" by Charles Narrey, Théâtre du Gymnase
- 1868: "The Rediscovered Path" by Louis Leroy, Théâtre du Gymnase
- 1868: "The World Where We Have Fun" by Édouard Pailleron, Théâtre du Gymnase
- 1873: "Andréa" by Victorien Sardou, Théâtre du Gymnase
- 1873: "Monsieur Alphonse" by Alexandre Dumas fils, Théâtre du Gymnase
- 1874: "The Widow" by Henri Meilhac and Ludovic Halévy, Théâtre du Gymnase
- 1875: "Yesterday's Scandals" by Théodore Barrière, Théâtre du Vaudeville
- 1880: "The Nabob" by Alphonse Daudet and Pierre Elzéar, Théâtre du Vaudeville
- 1881: "A Wedding Visit" by Alexandre Dumas fils, Théâtre du Vaudeville
- 1881: "Princess Georges" by Alexandre Dumas fils, Théâtre du Vaudeville
- 1881: "Odette" by Victorien Sardou, Théâtre du Vaudeville
- 1883: "Kings in Exile" by Alphonse Daudet and Paul Delair, Théâtre du Vaudeville

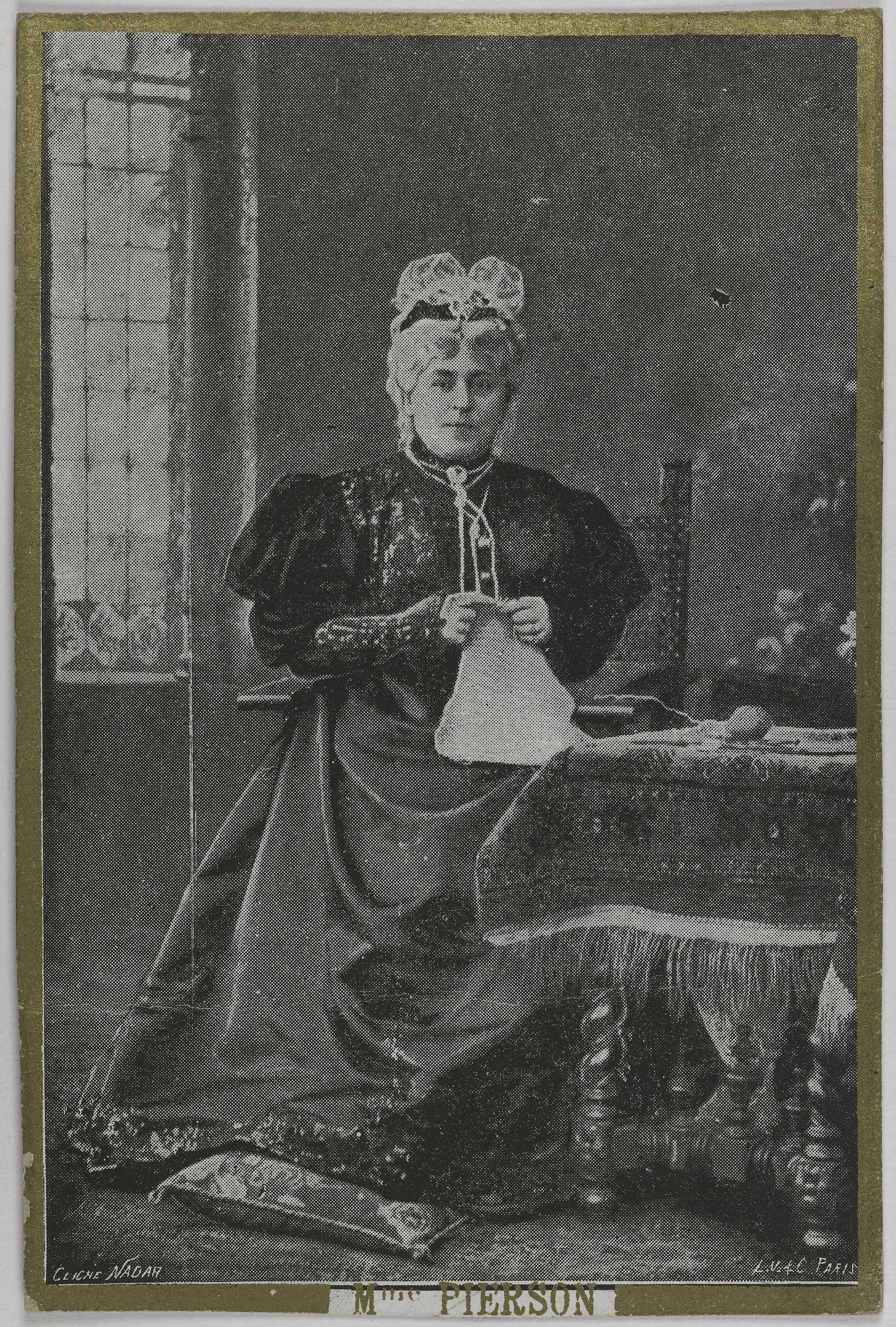
Photo of Blanche Adeline Pierson.

=== Career at the Comédie-Française: entered in 1884, appointed as the 313th shareholder in 1886 ===
- 1884: "Denise" by Alexandre Dumas fils, as Mme de Thauzette
- 1884: "A Scrap of Paper" by Victorien Sardou, as Suzanne
- 1890: "The Misanthrope" by Molière, as Arsinoé
- 1892: "Henry III and His Court" by Alexandre Dumas, as Catherine de Médicis
- 1893: "Embroidered Love" by François de Curel, as Emma
- 1895: "The Tongs" by Paul Hervieu, as Pauline Valenton
- 1898: "Catherine" by Henri Lavedan, as Duchesse de Coutras
- 1899: "History of Olden Times" by Guy de Maupassant
- 1899: "The Conscience of the Child" by Gaston Devore, as Mme Cauvelin
- 1901: "Our Youth" by Alfred Capus, as Laure de Roine
- 1903: "Business is Business" by Octave Mirbeau, as Mme Lechat
- 1903: "The Labyrinth" by Paul Hervieu, as Mme Vilard-Duval
- 1905: "The Awakening" by Paul Hervieu, as the Countess de Mégée
- 1906: "To Appear" by Maurice Donnay, as Mme Deguingois
- 1907: "Love Watches" by Robert de Flers and Gaston Arman de Caillavet, as Marquise de Juvigny
- 1908: "The Two Men" by Alfred Capus, as Mme Savier
- 1908: "The Hearth" by Octave Mirbeau and Thadée Natanson, as Mlle Rambert
- 1909: "Sire" by Henri Lavedan, as Mme de Saint-Salbi
- 1910: "The Countess of Escarbagnas" by Molière, as the countess
