= Arrondissement of Saint-Denis =

There are two distinct arrondissements in France which are called Arrondissement of Saint-Denis:

- Arrondissement of Saint-Denis in the Seine-Saint-Denis département
- Arrondissement of Saint-Denis in the Réunion département
