= Arrondissement of Saint-Denis, Réunion =

Coordinates: 20°52′58″S 55°26′55″E

Saint-Denis
- Arrondissement
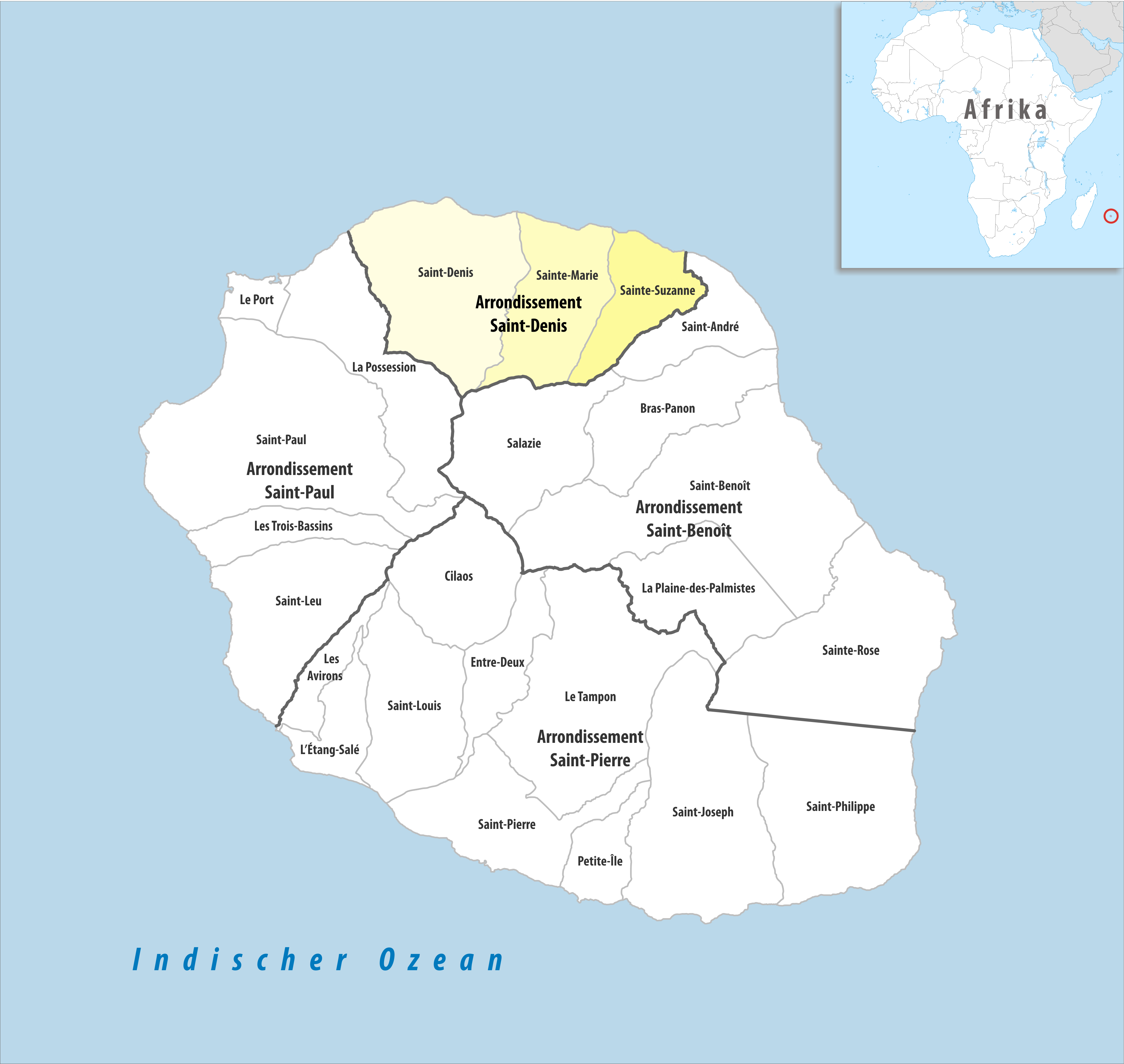
- Location within Réunion
- Country: France
- Overseas region and department: Réunion
- No. of communes: {{{nbcomm}}}
- Area: 287.8 km^{2} (111.1 sq mi)
- Population (2023): 218,278
  - Density: 758.4/km^{2} (1,964/sq mi)
- INSEE code: 9741

The arrondissement of Saint-Denis is an arrondissement of France in the Réunion department in the Réunion region. It has three communes. Its population is 213,402 (2021), and its area is 287.8 km^{2} (111.1 sq mi).

== Composition ==
The communes of the arrondissement of Saint-Denis, and their INSEE codes, are:

1. Saint-Denis (97411)
2. Sainte-Marie (97418)
3. Sainte-Suzanne (97420)

== History ==
At the creation of the department of Réunion in 1947, its only arrondissement was Saint-Denis. It lost 11 communes to the new arrondissement of Saint-Pierre in 1964, six communes to the new arrondissement of Saint-Benoît in 1968, and one commune to the new arrondissement of Saint-Paul in 1969. In September 2006 it lost the two communes of Le Port and La Possession to the arrondissement of Saint-Paul.

As a result of the reorganisation of the cantons of France which came into effect in 2015, the borders of the cantons are no longer related to the borders of the arrondissements. The cantons of the arrondissement of Saint-Benoît were, as of January 2015:

1. Saint-Denis-1
2. Saint-Denis-2
3. Saint-Denis-3
4. Saint-Denis-4
5. Saint-Denis-5
6. Saint-Denis-6
7. Saint-Denis-7
8. Saint-Denis-8
9. Saint-Denis-9
10. Sainte-Marie
11. Sainte-Suzanne
