= Malin to Mizen =

Trans-Ireland route

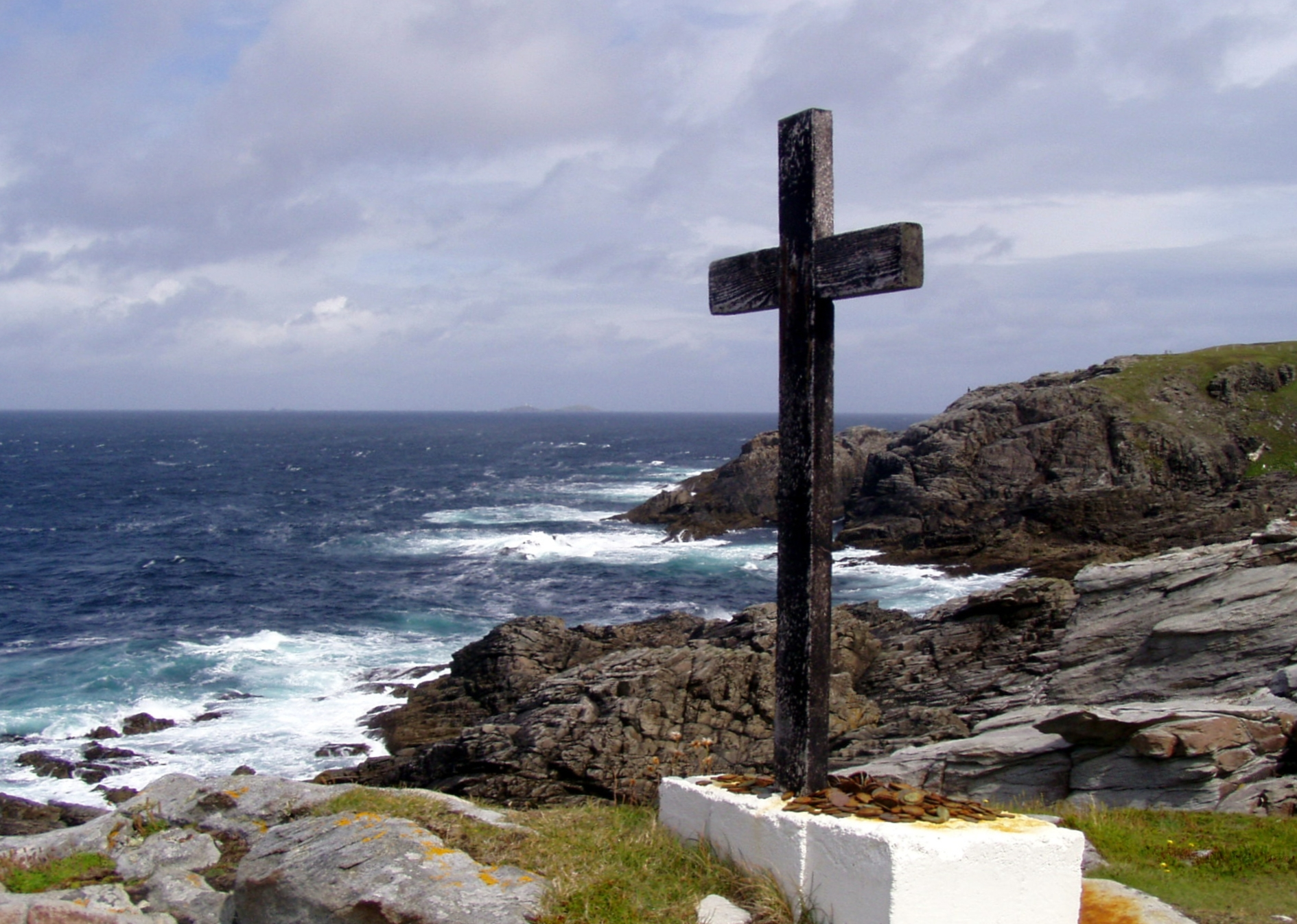
Malin Head

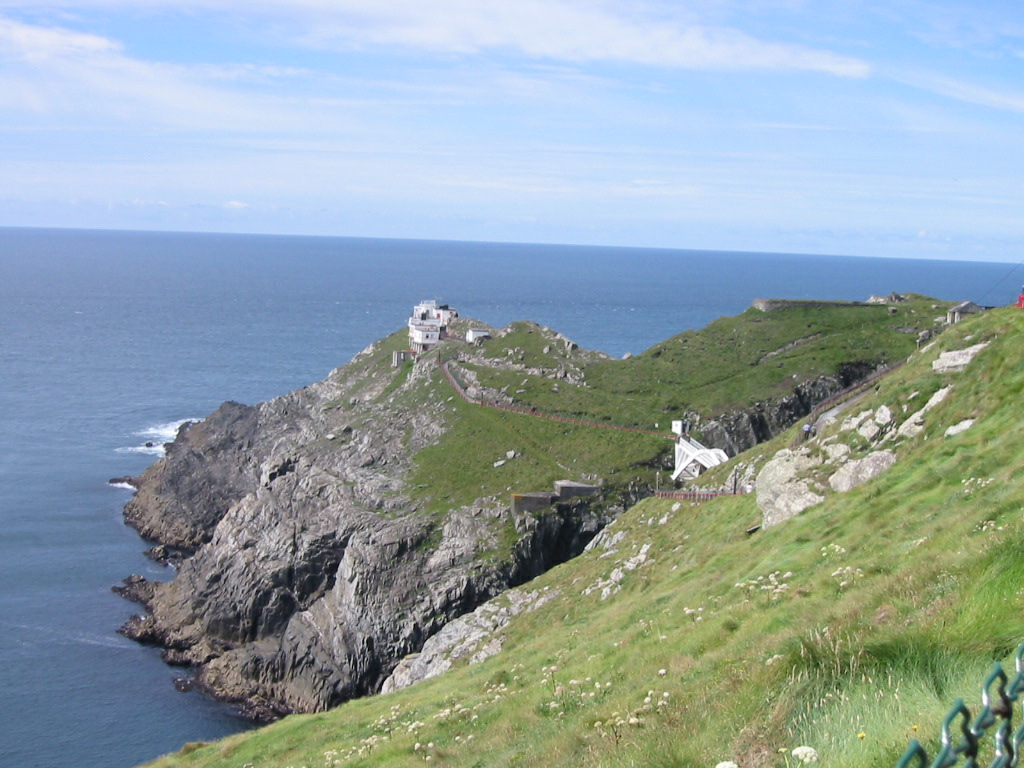
Mizen Head

Malin to Mizen (or Mizen to Malin) is the traversal of the entire length of the island of Ireland between its two extreme points: Mizen Head in County Cork (the island's most southerly point) and Malin Head in County Donegal (the most northerly).

The route is attempted by cyclists, runners, walkers, and motorists, and is sometimes undertaken to raise money for charity or as a personal endurance goal.

As the crow flies, the two points are about 466 km (290 mi) apart. The shortest practical road route measures roughly 569 km (354 mi), while most modern traverses cover between 600 and 640 km (370 and 400 mi) depending on the chosen course.

== Cycling ==
As of 2023, the record for cycling from Mizen Head to Malin Head was 15 hours 30 minutes 36 seconds, set by Ronan McLaughlin (Foyle CC) on 11 June 2023. The women's national record for the same route (Mizen→Malin), also set in 2023, is 21 hours 43 minutes 03 seconds by Karen Cassidy (25 September 2023).

Other records include the first non-stop double crossing (Malin→Mizen→Malin) Joe Barr's records in June 2015 (North→South 23 h 20 m; South→North 25 h 40 m; double in 49 h). Barr later bettered the non-stop double crossing in 2020, finishing in 44 h 15 m.

=== Cycling records ===
Fastest verified single crossings (selected)

Rank	Date	Direction	Name	Club/team	Time	Verification	Notes	Source(s)
1	11 June 2023	Mizen→Malin	Ronan McLaughlin	Foyle CC	15 h 30 m 36 s	Cycling Ireland (NR)	Current Irish record.	
2	13 September 2020	Mizen→Malin	Donncha Cuttriss	Over the Hill CC	17 h 36 m 45 s	Eirball archive of CI records	Pre-2023 national best.	
3	6 March 2020	Malin→Mizen	Jason Black	—	22 h 59 m	WUCA (record ratified)	World UltraCycling Association Ireland N→S record.	
4	19 June 2015	Malin→Mizen	Joe Barr	Team Joe Barr	23 h 20 m	Independent timing	Part of 2015 record suite.	
5	21 June 2015	Mizen→Malin	Joe Barr	Team Joe Barr	25 h 40 m	Independent timing	Return leg of 2015 double.	

Women

Rank	Date	Direction	Name	Club/team	Time	Verification	Notes	Source(s)
1	25 September 2023	Mizen→Malin	Karen Cassidy	—	21 h 43 m 03 s	Cycling Ireland (NR)	Current Irish record.	
2	31 July 2022	Mizen→Malin	Patricia McGinley	—	30 h 38 m	WUCA / Guinness	Standard-bike female record.	

== Running ==
Early modern record progressions on foot include Richard Donovan's 2008 Mizen→Malin run (5 days 13 hours 23 minutes). Jennifer Salter subsequently ran Malin→Mizen in 4 days 23 hours 03 minutes 10 seconds (finishing 10 June 2011). Sharon Gayter improved the mark in March 2012 (4 days 1 hour 39 minutes 55 seconds, Mizen→Malin). Later in 2012, Mimi Anderson lowered it again to 3 days 15 hours 36 minutes 23 seconds (Malin→Mizen).

In May 2017, Irish international ultra-runner Eoin Keith ran Mizen→Malin in 3 days 3 hours 47 minutes. The current men’s supported FKT is held by Ed McGroarty at 3 days 1 hour 55 minutes 15 seconds (5 July 2021, Mizen→Malin). On 31 May 2024, Sophie Power set the Guinness World Record for the fastest female crossing on foot (Malin→Mizen) in 3 days 12 hours 08 minutes.

=== Running records ===
Men (verified bests)

Rank	Date	Direction	Name	Club	Time	Verification	Notes	Source(s)
1	5 July 2021	Mizen→Malin	Ed McGroarty	Lifford–Strabane AC	3 d 1 h 55 m 15 s	FKT (supported)	Current men’s supported FKT.	
2	2 May 2017	Mizen→Malin	Eoin Keith	Sportsworld RC	3 d 3 h 47 m	Athletics Ireland / media reports	Former overall best.	
3	April 1988	Mizen→Malin	Richard Brown	—	4 d 12 h	LDWA / Ultrarunning World archive	Earliest documented modern record.	
4	29 June 2008	Mizen→Malin	Richard Donovan	Galway City Harriers	5 d 13 h 23 m	RTÉ News	Modern-era Ireland end-to-end run.	

Women (verified bests)

Rank	Date	Direction	Name	Club	Time	Verification	Notes	Source(s)
1	31 May 2024	Malin→Mizen	Sophie Power	—	3 d 12 h 08 m	Guinness World Records	Current women’s record.	
2	25 September 2012	Malin→Mizen	Mimi Anderson	—	3 d 15 h 36 m 23 s	Guinness / FKT	Former world record.	
3	29 March 2012	Mizen→Malin	Sharon Gayter	New Marske Harriers	4 d 1 h 39 m 55 s	University PR / media	Former women’s record.	
4	10 June 2011	Malin→Mizen	Jennifer (Jen) Salter	Les Croupiers RC	4 d 23 h 03 m 10 s	Club / media reports	Women’s record at the time.	

== Walking ==
End-to-end crossings are also undertaken on foot as walking challenges, often for charity. Notable long-distance walkers include John Dowling (race-walker), credited with completing the route in 5 days 22 hours 30 minutes in March 1982 (Mizen→Malin). The route is also a popular multi-week backpacking itinerary, commonly reported in 3–4 weeks depending on route and support.

== Other uses of the phrase ==
Variants of the phrase "Malin to Mizen" is sometimes used to represent the whole geographical extent of Ireland: "a Malin Head to Mizen Head approach".

== See also ==
- Land's End to John o' Groats
- Du battant des lames au sommet des montagnes
- Wild Atlantic Way
