= Territoire de la Côte Ouest =

- Communauté d'agglomération
- Country: France
- Overseas region and department: Réunion{{{region}}}
- No. of communes: {{{nbcomm}}}
- Established: 2001
- Area: 537.2 km^{2} (207.4 sq mi)
- Population (2018): 210,928
  - Density: 392.6/km^{2} (1,017/sq mi)

Territoire de la Côte Ouest is the agglomeration community, an intercommunal structure, centred on the city of Saint-Paul. It is located in Réunion, an overseas department and region of France. It was created in December 2001. Its seat is in Le Port. Its area is 537.2 km^{2}. Its population was 210,928 in 2018, of which 103,492 in Saint-Paul proper.

== Composition ==
The communauté d'agglomération consists of the following 5 communes:

1. Le Port
2. La Possession
3. Saint-Leu
4. Saint-Paul
5. Les Trois-Bassins
