= Hôtel de Ville, Saint-Paul, Réunion =

Town hall in Saint-Paul, Réunion, France

Hôtel de Ville
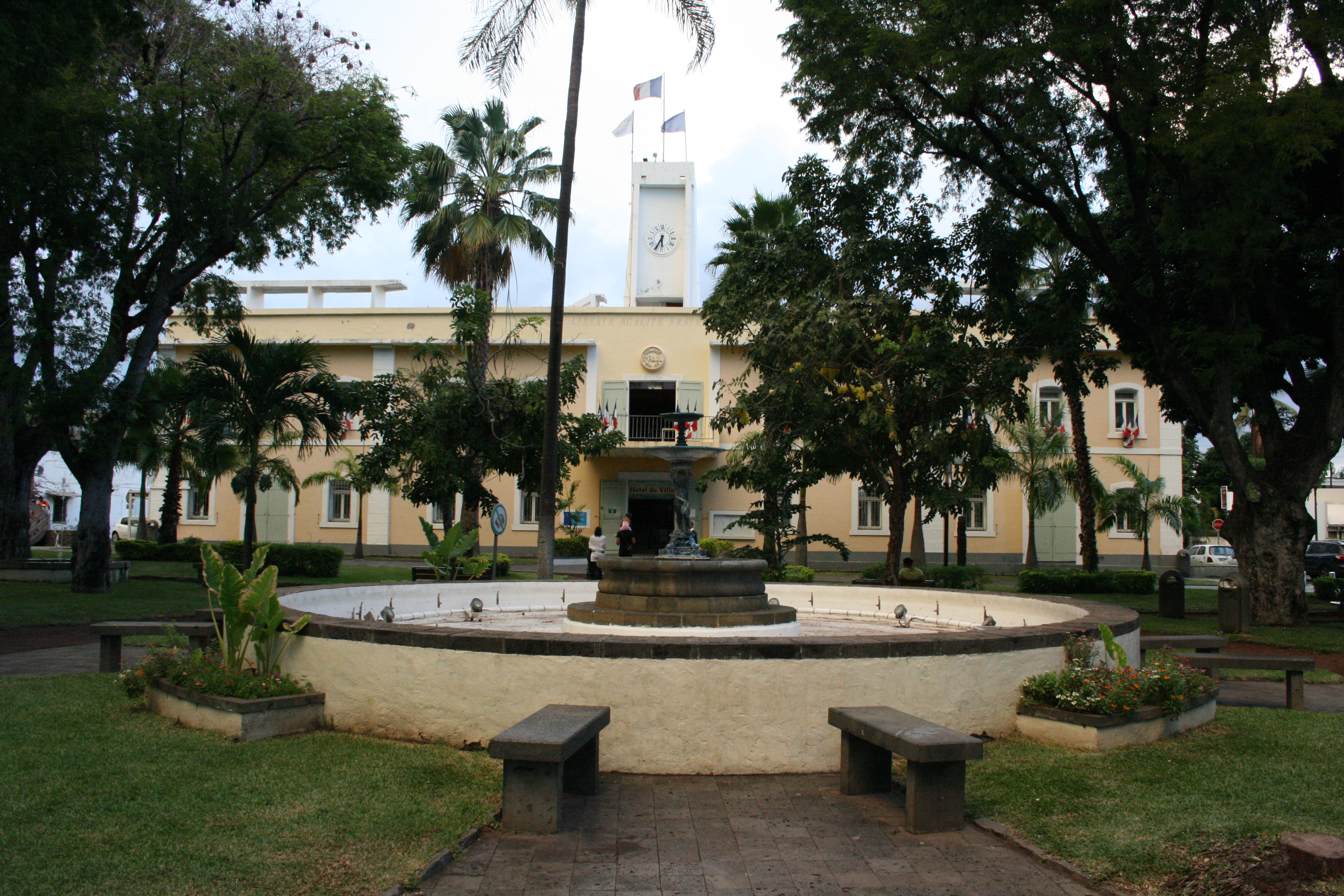
- The main frontage of the Hôtel de Ville in May 2011
- Interactive map of the Hôtel de Ville area

General information
- Type: City hall
- Architectural style: Neoclassical style
- Location: Saint-Paul, Réunion, France
- Coordinates: 21.0097°S 55.2697°E
- Completed: 1740

Design and construction
- Architect: Édouard Robert

The Hôtel de Ville (French pronunciation: [otɛl də vil], City Hall) is a municipal building in Saint-Paul, Réunion, in the Indian Ocean, standing on Place Général de Gaulle.

== History ==
Saint-Paul was the earliest part of the island to develop as an urban centre and served as its capital from the early 16th century, until Saint-Denis became the capital in 1738. However, the current building was commissioned not as a municipal building but as a coffee store. Following the destruction of the island's timber-framed coffee store in a serious fire in July 1723, the French Indies Company decided to commission a new coffee store of stone construction. Construction of the new store started in 1735. It was designed by Édouard Robert, built in rubble masonry with a cement render and was completed in 1740.

The design involved a rectangular building, oriented in a position which was perpendicular to the sea. It had a flat roof made of "argamasse", a type of mortar developed by the French East India Company by mixing sand, crushed brick, lime, egg whites, curdled milk and fats, so that the roof could be used for drying coffee beans. In 1766, the building was requisitioned by the French Government, converted for use as infantry barracks, and given a pitched roof. An ammunition depot attached to the barracks was later relocated to another site.

In 1888, the town council, which had previously operated without a dedicated town hall, decided to use the building as its regular meeting place. The area in front of the building was improved when Jean Milhet de Fontarabie, who had served as mayor of Saint-Paul from 1872 to 1884, decided to pay for a fountain. The design of the fountain involved four waterspouts, and a cast iron column supporting a vase shaped top.

The use of the building for municipal purposes was regularised in 1916, when the town council acquired the building from the French Government for FFr 10,000. Essential repairs were carried out after a cyclone caused serious damage to some 60% of all buildings on the island, including the town hall, in 1948. More significant alterations were carried out to give the building a more municipal look in 1952. The new design involved a symmetrical main frontage of 11 bays facing northeast towards a small square. The alterations included removal of the pitched roof, the installation of fins at the four corners of the new flat roof, the creation of a balcony above the main doorway and the addition of a central belfry with a clock. Internally, a Salle du Conseil (council chamber) was established and a series of small offices created.
