= Ligne des Bambous =

Village on the island of Réunion, France

Coordinates: 21°18′10″S 55°29′38″E

Ligne des Bambous is a village on the island of Réunion, located near its southern coast in the commune of Saint-Pierre.
