= Canton of Le Port =

Coordinates: 20.94°S 55.29°E

Le Port
- Canton
- Interactive map of Le Port
- Country: France
- Overseas region and department: Réunion{{{region}}}
- No. of communes: {{{nbcomm}}}
- Area: 16.62 km^{2} (6.42 sq mi)
- Population (2023): 33,969
  - Density: 2,044/km^{2} (5,294/sq mi)
- INSEE code: 97402

The Canton of Le Port (French: canton du Port) is a canton of Réunion, an overseas department and region of France. It was created at the French canton reorganisation which came into effect in March 2015. Its seat is in Le Port.

It consists of the following communes:

1. Le Port
