= Canton of Saint-Leu =

Coordinates: 21.17°S 55.29°E

The canton of Saint-Leu is an administrative division of Réunion, an overseas department and region of France. It was created at the French canton reorganisation which came into effect in March 2015. Its seat is in Saint-Leu.

It consists of the following communes:

1. Saint-Leu (partly)
2. Les Trois-Bassins
