= STANAG 4285 =

STANAG 4285 is a NATO HF radio technical standard for text-based radio broadcasts. It corresponds to "NATO mode" in the US military standard MIL-STD-188-110B.

STANAG 4285 specifies a method to communicate text over a radio link. One 1800 Hz tone is modulated using phase-shift keying with eight states (8PSK). The symbol rate is 2400 tones per second. This results in signal taking up a 2400 Hz bandwidth from 600 to 3000 Hz. The data rate is 1200, 2400 or 2400 bits per second.
