= Le Port, Réunion =

Commune in Réunion, France

Le Port
- Commune
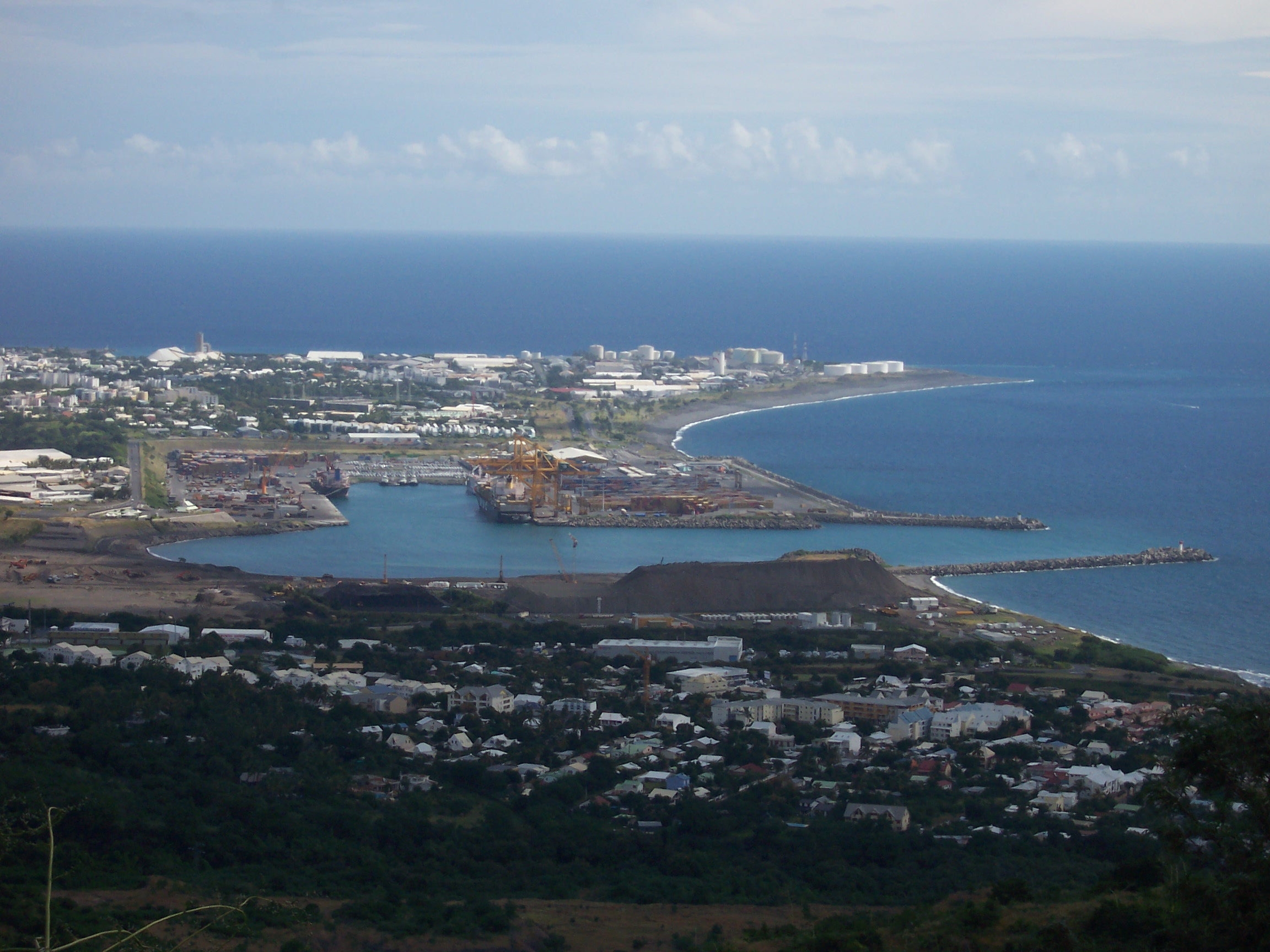
- Harbour in Le Port

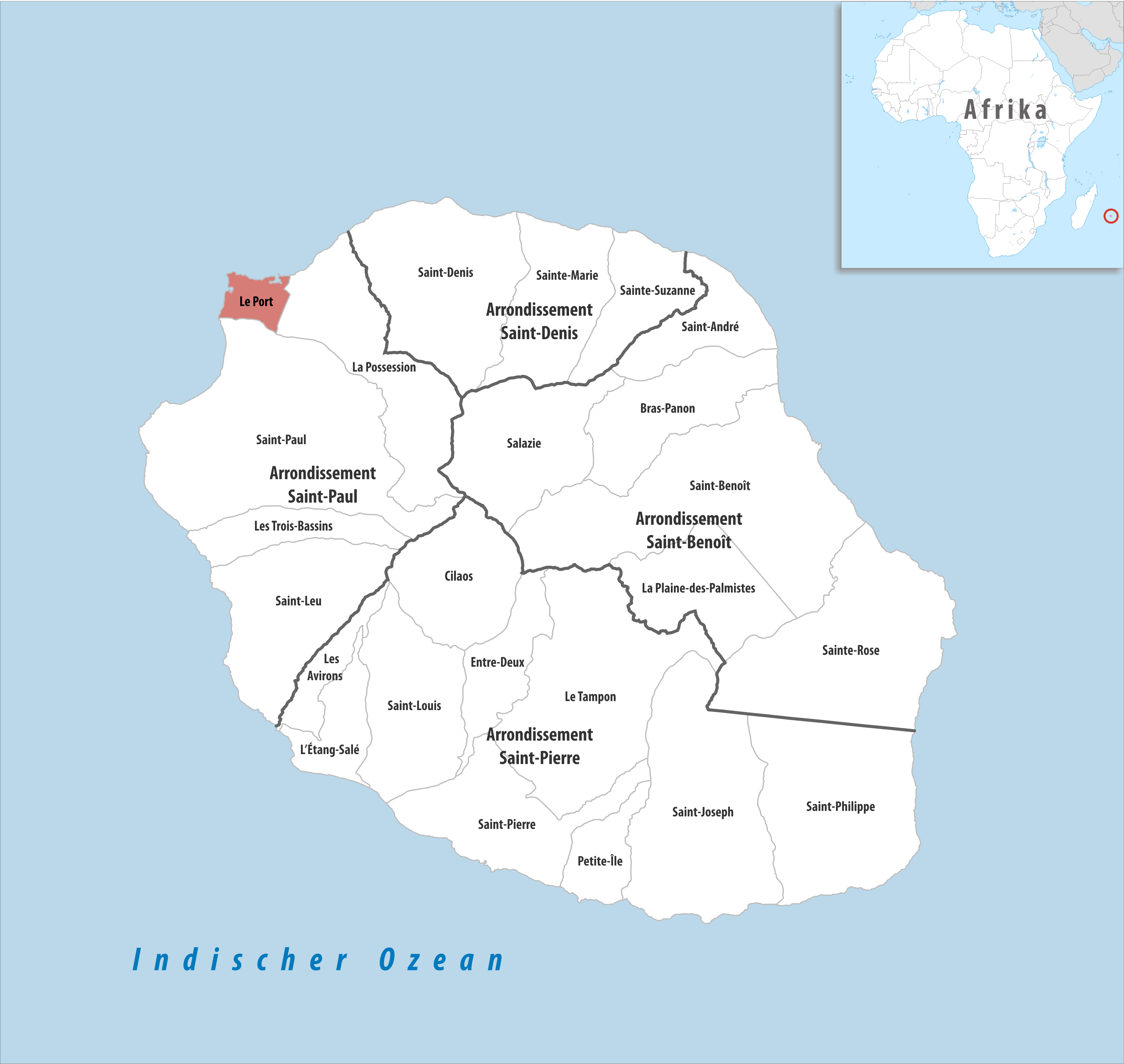
- Location of Le Port
- Coordinates: 20°56′22″S 55°17′14″E
- Country: France
- Overseas region and department: Réunion
- Arrondissement: Saint-Paul
- Canton: Le Port
- Intercommunality: Territoire de la Côte Ouest

Government
  - Mayor (2020–2026): Olivier Hoarau
- Area^{1}: 16.62 km^{2} (6.42 sq mi)
- Elevation: 6 m (20 ft)
- Highest elevation: 110 m (360 ft)
- Lowest elevation: 0 m (0 ft)
- Population (2023): 33,969
  - Density: 2,044/km^{2} (5,294/sq mi)
- Time zone: UTC+04:00
- INSEE/Postal code: 97407 /97420
- ^{1} French Land Register data, which excludes lakes, ponds, glaciers > 1 km^{2} (0.386 sq mi or 247 acres) and river estuaries.

Le Port (French pronunciation: [lə pɔʁ]; Reunionese Creole: Por) is a commune in the French overseas department of Réunion. It is located at the extreme northwest corner of the island of Réunion. It has a population of 33,969 (2023). It hosts the main harbor of the island. The commune also serves as Réunion's primary industrial and logistics centre. Its port facilities support most of the island's maritime freight traffic and are surrounded by industrial and commercial zones that play a significant role in the local economy.

== Climate ==
Le Port features a hot semi-arid climate (Köppen BSh). Due to located leeward side of the island, Le Port does not receive as much precipitation as Saint-Denis and the eastern part of the island. There is a wetter season from December to April and a drier season for the rest of the year. The warmest month is February, with a mean of 28.4 °C (83.1 °F) and an average high of 31.9 °C (89.4 °F). February is also the wettest month, receiving 118.3 millimetres (4.66 in) of rain on average. The coolest months are July and August, which have a mean of 22.9 °C (73.2 °F). July is also the driest month, receiving only 5.0 millimetres (0.20 in) of rainfall on average. On 6 March 2004, Le Port recorded a temperature of 36.9 °C (98.4 °F), which is the highest temperature to have ever been recorded in Réunion. Le Port receives 2670.6 hours of sunshine annually, which is evenly distributed throughout the year. February is the least sunny and July is sunniest, although all months receive between 205 and 232 hours of sunshine on average.

Climate data for Le Port, Réunion (1991−2020 normals, extremes 1974−present)
Month	Jan	Feb	Mar	Apr	May	Jun	Jul	Aug	Sep	Oct	Nov	Dec	Year
Record high °C (°F)	35.5 (95.9)	36.9 (98.4)	36.9 (98.4)	36.0 (96.8)	33.8 (92.8)	32.2 (90.0)	30.7 (87.3)	30.7 (87.3)	31.4 (88.5)	32.6 (90.7)	33.5 (92.3)	35.0 (95.0)	36.9 (98.4)
Mean daily maximum °C (°F)	31.5 (88.7)	31.9 (89.4)	31.5 (88.7)	30.9 (87.6)	29.3 (84.7)	27.7 (81.9)	26.7 (80.1)	26.6 (79.9)	27.0 (80.6)	28.0 (82.4)	29.2 (84.6)	30.7 (87.3)	29.3 (84.7)
Daily mean °C (°F)	28.1 (82.6)	28.4 (83.1)	27.9 (82.2)	27.2 (81.0)	25.5 (77.9)	23.9 (75.0)	22.9 (73.2)	22.9 (73.2)	23.3 (73.9)	24.4 (75.9)	25.6 (78.1)	27.2 (81.0)	25.6 (78.1)
Mean daily minimum °C (°F)	24.7 (76.5)	24.9 (76.8)	24.3 (75.7)	23.4 (74.1)	21.8 (71.2)	20.0 (68.0)	19.1 (66.4)	19.1 (66.4)	19.6 (67.3)	20.8 (69.4)	22.1 (71.8)	23.7 (74.7)	22.0 (71.6)
Record low °C (°F)	21.8 (71.2)	21.0 (69.8)	20.5 (68.9)	19.9 (67.8)	16.8 (62.2)	16.6 (61.9)	14.9 (58.8)	15.5 (59.9)	15.6 (60.1)	15.6 (60.1)	18.5 (65.3)	20.4 (68.7)	14.9 (58.8)
Average precipitation mm (inches)	118.3 (4.66)	118.3 (4.66)	104.7 (4.12)	39.9 (1.57)	18.5 (0.73)	16.5 (0.65)	5.0 (0.20)	8.5 (0.33)	7.7 (0.30)	9.8 (0.39)	20.4 (0.80)	71.7 (2.82)	539.3 (21.23)
Average precipitation days (≥ 1 mm)	8.0	7.0	5.9	3.3	2.8	1.4	1.1	1.4	1.1	1.3	2.1	4.6	40.2
Mean monthly sunshine hours	225.4	205.5	219.9	221.1	229.7	226.8	231.9	227.0	209.3	222.2	220.8	231.1	2,670.6
Source 1: Meteo France
Source 2: Meteociel.fr (sunshine 1981-2010)

== Population ==
Historical population
Year	Pop.	±% p.a.
1961	14,906	—
1967	19,768	+4.82%
1974	25,068	+3.45%
1982	30,131	+2.33%
1990	34,692	+1.78%
1999	38,412	+1.14%
2007	38,313	−0.03%
2012	36,952	−0.72%
2017	34,128	−1.58%
2023	33,969	−0.08%
Source: SPLAF and INSEE (1967-2023)

== International relations ==
Le Port is twinned with:

- Durban, South Africa
- Toamasina, Madagascar
- Port Louis, Mauritius
- Quelimane, Mozambique

== Politics and media ==
This is the town where the Communist Party of Réunion usually gets most of their votes. Also, the newspaper of the party, Temoignages, has headquarters in Le Port.

The French Navy's technical/data radio station FUX, using Stanag 4285, operates out of Le Port on various frequencies (see lists of radio stations by frequency).

== See also ==
- Communes of the Réunion department
