= Cantons of Saint-Denis =

Coordinates: 20.88°S 55.45°E

The cantons of Saint-Denis are administrative divisions of Réunion, an overseas department and region of France. Since the French canton reorganisation which came into effect in March 2015, the city of Saint-Denis is subdivided into 4 cantons. Their seat is in Saint-Denis.

== Cantons ==
| Name | Population (2019) | Cantonal Code |
|---|---|---|
| Canton of Saint-Denis-1 | 43,880 | 97409 |
| Canton of Saint-Denis-2 | 33,478 | 97410 |
| Canton of Saint-Denis-3 | 38,783 | 97411 |
| Canton of Saint-Denis-4 | 37,669 | 97412 |
