= Canton of La Possession =

Coordinates: 20.93°S 55.34°E

La Possession
- Canton
- Interactive map of La Possession
- Country: France
- Overseas region and department: Réunion{{{region}}}
- No. of communes: {{{nbcomm}}}
- Area: 118.35 km^{2} (45.70 sq mi)
- Population (2023): 36,568
  - Density: 308.98/km^{2} (800.26/sq mi)
- INSEE code: 97403

The canton of La Possession is an administrative division of Réunion, an overseas department and region of France. Its borders were not modified at the French canton reorganisation which came into effect in March 2015. Its seat is in La Possession.

It consists of the following communes:

1. La Possession
