= Grand Bénare =

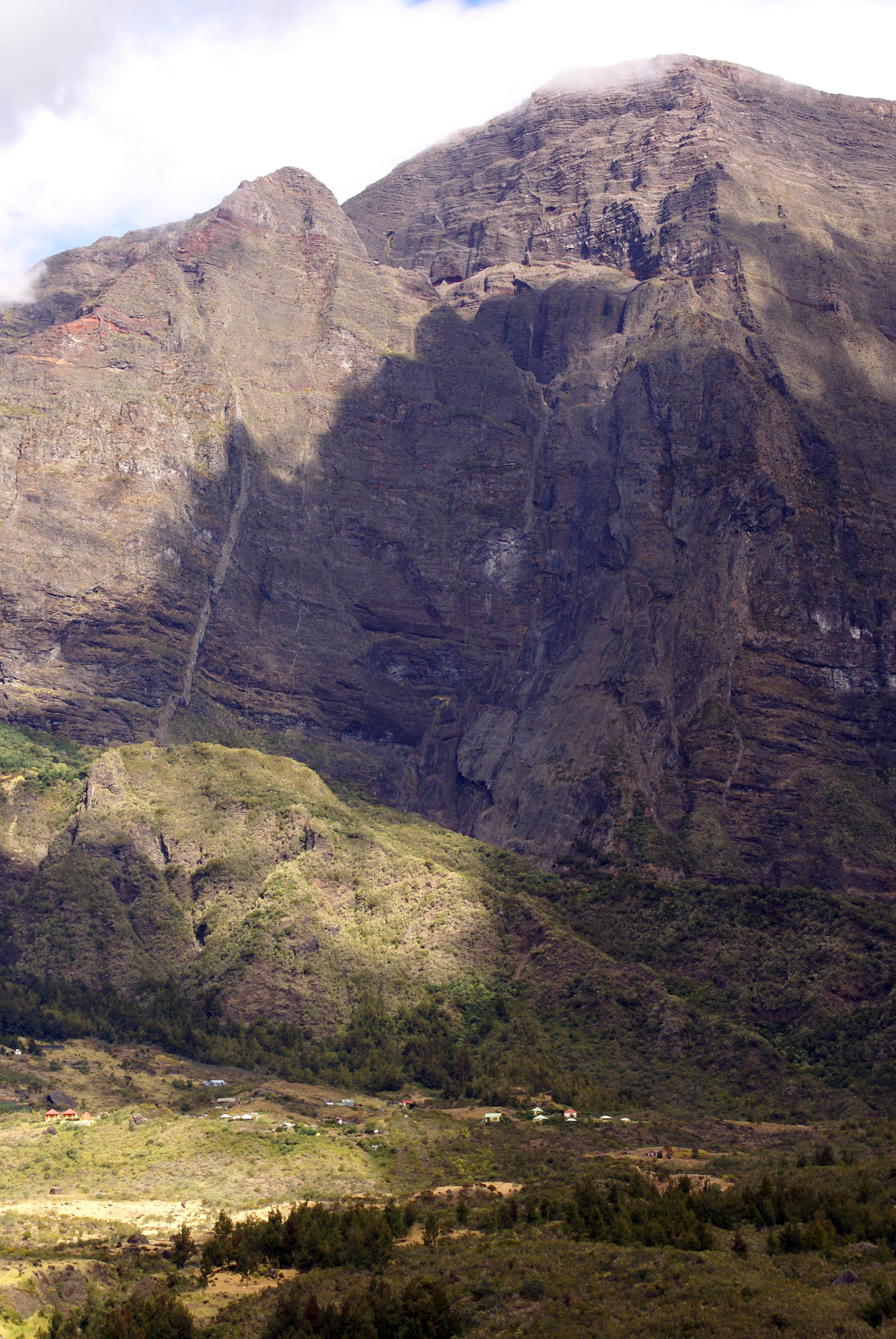
- Grand Bénare seen from Mafate with the hamlet of Marla in the foreground

Highest point
- Elevation: 2,898 m (9,508 ft)
- Coordinates: 21°06′58″S 55°25′22″E

Naming
- Language of name: French

Geography
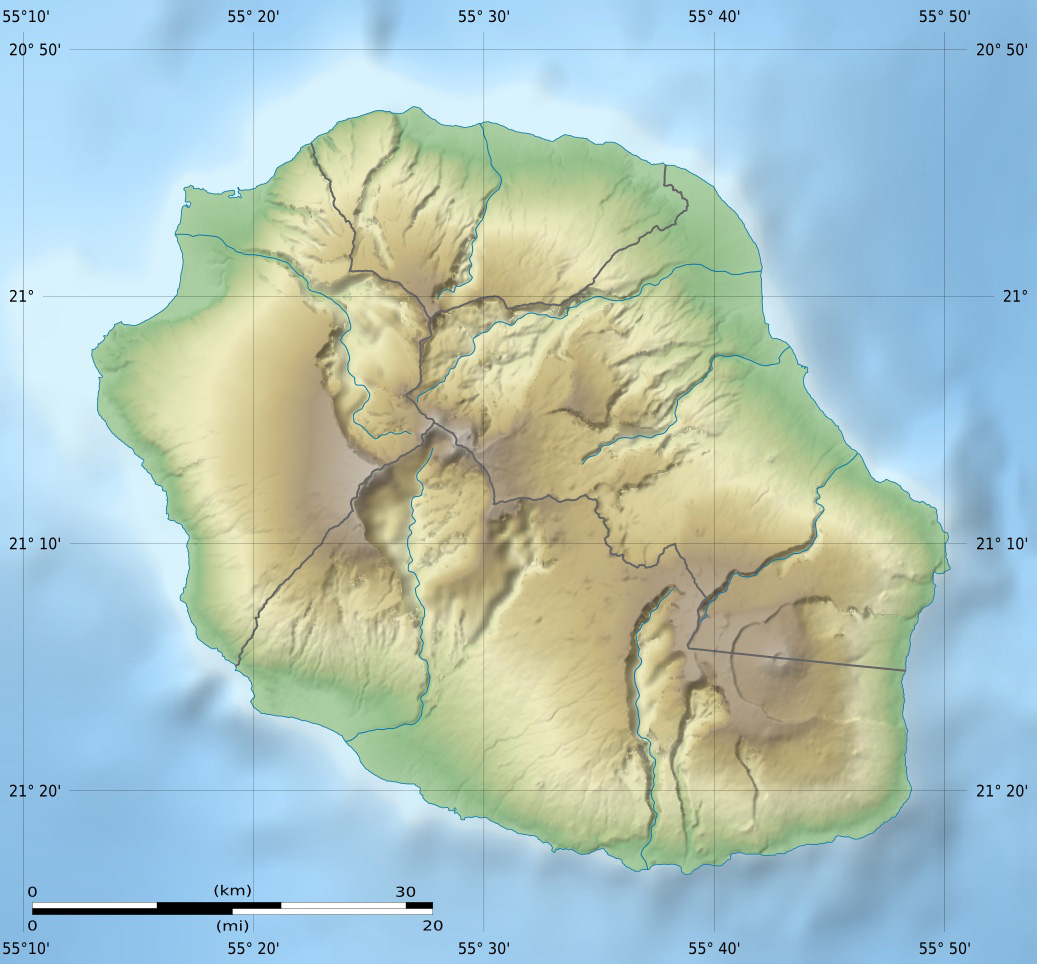
- Location within Réunion
- Location: Réunion, Indian Ocean

Climbing
- Easiest route: From Maïdo

The Grand Bénare is a volcanic peak on the island of Réunion, located in the western part of the island, overlooking the "Cirque de Mafate" and "Cirque de Cilaos". It is the third highest peak on the island, after the Piton des Neiges and the Gros Morne.

It is most often accessed by hike from the Maido in the heights of Saint Paul.
