= Cantons of Saint-Paul =

Coordinates: 21.01°S 55.27°E

The cantons of Saint-Paul are administrative divisions of Réunion, an overseas department and region of France. Since the French canton reorganisation which came into effect in March 2015, the city of Saint-Paul is subdivided into 3 cantons. Their seat is in Saint-Paul.

== Cantons ==
| Name | Population (2019) | Cantonal Code |
|---|---|---|
| Canton of Saint-Paul-1 | 32,850 | 97417 |
| Canton of Saint-Paul-2 | 33,893 | 97418 |
| Canton of Saint-Paul-3 | 36,465 | 97419 |
