= Saint-Paul, Réunion =

Subprefecture and commune in Réunion, France

Saint-Paul Sin-Pol (Réunion Creole French)
- Subprefecture and commune
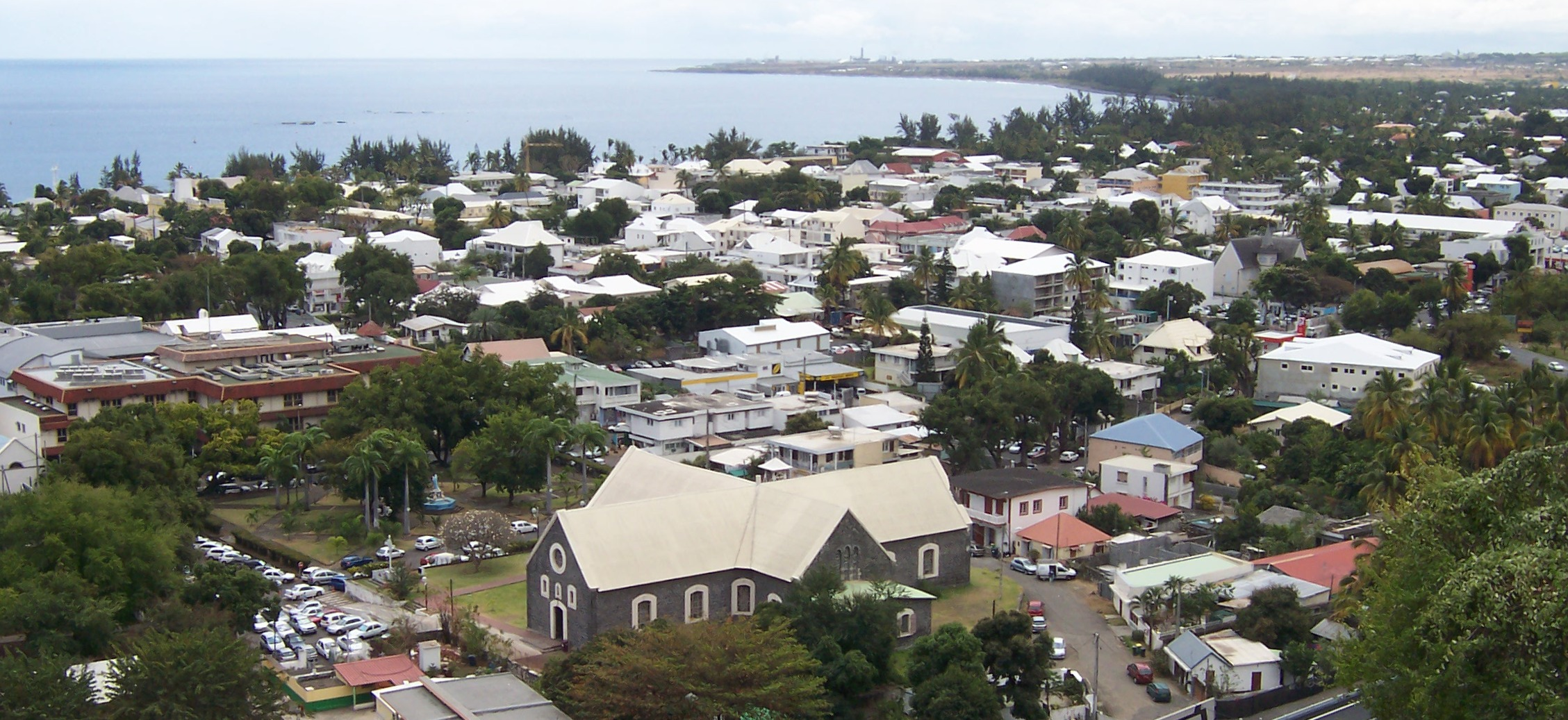
- A view over the town centre and the gulf of Saint-Paul

- Coat of arms

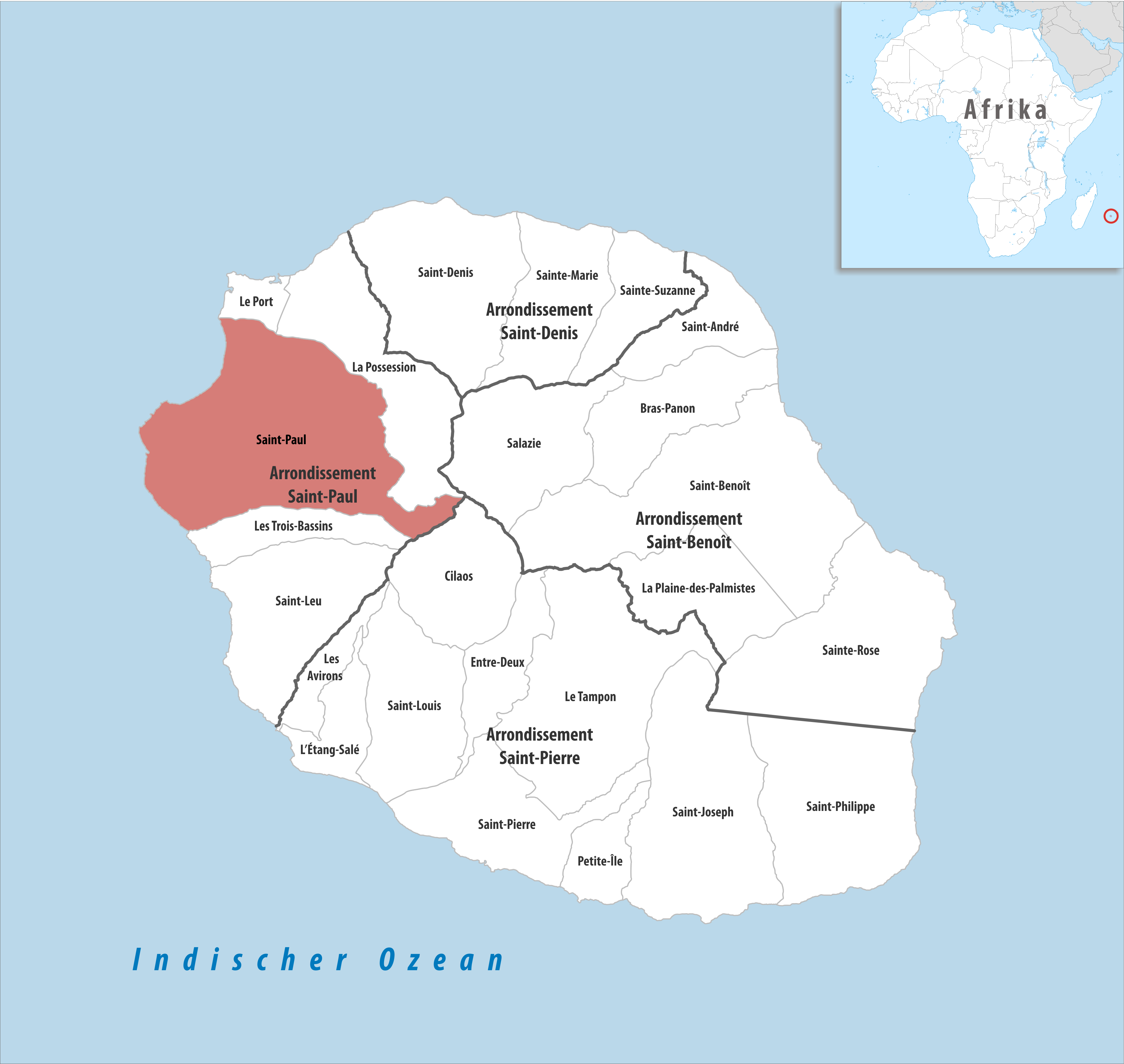
- Location of Saint-Paul
- Coordinates: 21°00′35″S 55°16′11″E
- Country: France
- Overseas region and department: Réunion
- Arrondissement: Saint-Paul
- Canton: 3 cantons
- Intercommunality: Territoire de la Côte Ouest

Government
  - Mayor (2021–2026): Emmanuel Seraphin
- Area^{1}: 241.28 km^{2} (93.16 sq mi)
- Elevation: 4 m (13 ft)
- Highest elevation: 2,955 m (9,695 ft)
- Lowest elevation: 0 m (0 ft)
- Population (2023): 108,088
  - Density: 447.98/km^{2} (1,160.3/sq mi)
- Time zone: UTC+04:00
- INSEE/Postal code: 97415 /97460
- ^{1} French Land Register data, which excludes lakes, ponds, glaciers > 1 km^{2} (0.386 sq mi or 247 acres) and river estuaries.

Saint-Paul (French pronunciation: [sɛ̃ pɔl]; Reunionese Creole: Sin-Pol) is the second-largest commune in the French overseas department of Réunion. It is located on the extreme west side of the island of Réunion.

== History ==
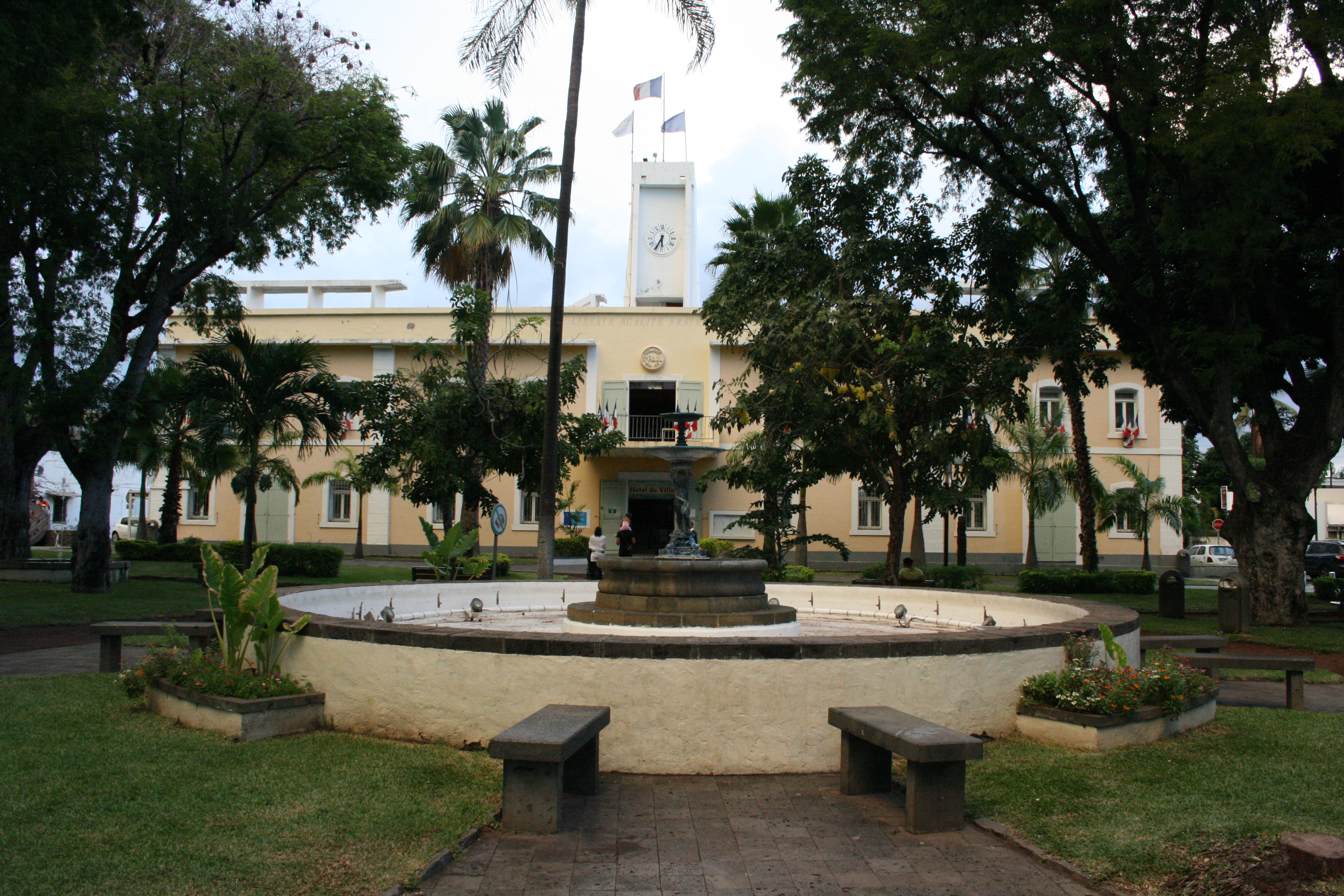
The Hôtel de Ville

Saint-Paul was the capital of the island from its settlement in the early 16th century, until Saint-Denis took over that role in 1738.

The Hôtel de Ville dates from about 1740.

Until 1999, near Saint Paul there was the 428-metre (1,404 ft) tall mast OMEGA Chabrier transmitter.

== Population ==
Historical population
Year	Pop.	±% p.a.
1961	35,528	—
1967	43,129	+3.28%
1974	52,554	+2.86%
1982	58,412	+1.33%
1990	71,669	+2.59%
1999	87,712	+2.27%
2007	101,023	+1.78%
2012	104,646	+0.71%
2017	104,519	−0.02%
2023	108,088	+0.56%
Source: SPLAF and INSEE (1967-2023)

== Transport ==
Saint-Paul was to be the western terminus of the proposed Réunion Tram Train. However, the project was abandoned in May 2010 due to a lack of funds.

The traditional grave of French pirate Olivier Levasseur, nicknamed La Buse ("The Buzzard") or La Bouche ("The Mouth"), who was most famous for allegedly hiding one of the biggest treasures in pirate history, estimated at over £1 billion, is located in Saint-Paul's Cimetière marin de Saint-Paul cemetery. Besides pirates, the cemetery also serves as the permanent resting place of poets Leconte de Lisle and Eugène Dayot, as well as the painter Arthur Grimaud.

== Geography ==
=== Climate ===
Saint-Paul has a hot semi-arid climate (Köppen climate classification: BSh), tropical savanna climate (Köppen climate classification: Aw) and subtropical highland climate (Köppen climate classification: Cwb) within various parts of the commune. The average annual temperature in Saint-Paul is 25.3 °C (77.5 °F). The average annual rainfall is 482.3 mm (18.99 in) with January as the wettest month. The temperatures are highest on average in February, at around 28.2 °C (82.8 °F), and lowest in July, at around 22.3 °C (72.1 °F). The highest temperature ever recorded in Saint-Paul was 37.0 °C (98.6 °F) on 25 January 2019; the coldest temperature ever recorded was 15.1 °C (59.2 °F) on 14 August 1991.

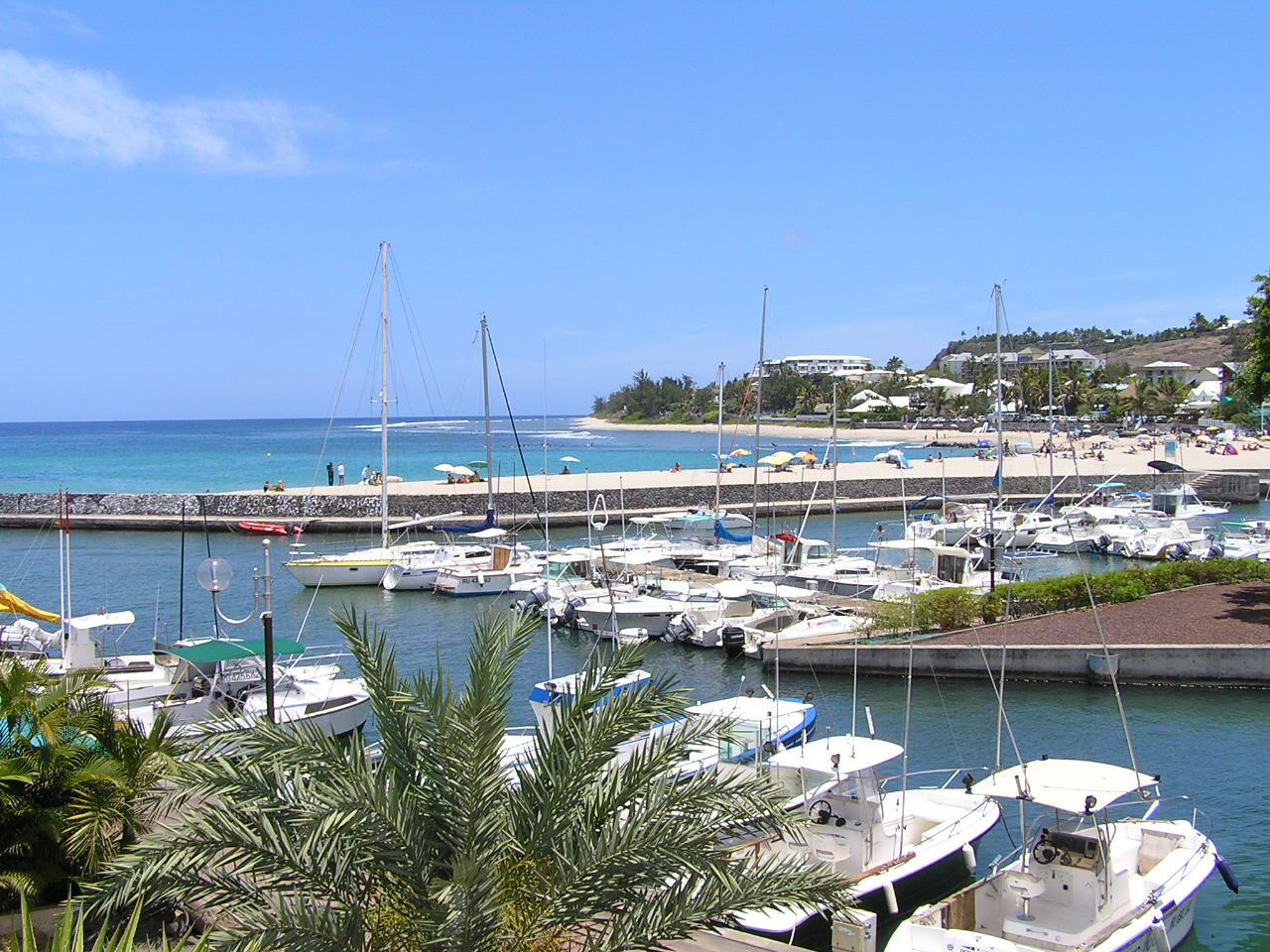
Saint-Gilles

Climate data for Saint-Paul (Pointe des Trois-Bassins, altitude 5m, 1991–2020 normals, extremes 1987–present)
Month	Jan	Feb	Mar	Apr	May	Jun	Jul	Aug	Sep	Oct	Nov	Dec	Year
Record high °C (°F)	37.0 (98.6)	35.4 (95.7)	35.7 (96.3)	34.9 (94.8)	32.4 (90.3)	31.3 (88.3)	29.7 (85.5)	29.7 (85.5)	31.1 (88.0)	32.6 (90.7)	34.8 (94.6)	35.7 (96.3)	37.0 (98.6)
Mean daily maximum °C (°F)	31.6 (88.9)	31.7 (89.1)	31.2 (88.2)	30.3 (86.5)	28.5 (83.3)	26.8 (80.2)	25.9 (78.6)	26.1 (79.0)	26.7 (80.1)	28.0 (82.4)	29.4 (84.9)	30.9 (87.6)	28.9 (84.0)
Daily mean °C (°F)	28.1 (82.6)	28.2 (82.8)	27.6 (81.7)	26.7 (80.1)	24.9 (76.8)	23.2 (73.8)	22.3 (72.1)	22.4 (72.3)	23.0 (73.4)	24.2 (75.6)	25.7 (78.3)	27.3 (81.1)	25.3 (77.5)
Mean daily minimum °C (°F)	24.6 (76.3)	24.6 (76.3)	24.1 (75.4)	23.1 (73.6)	21.4 (70.5)	19.7 (67.5)	18.7 (65.7)	18.7 (65.7)	19.3 (66.7)	20.5 (68.9)	21.9 (71.4)	23.6 (74.5)	21.7 (71.1)
Record low °C (°F)	21.3 (70.3)	20.9 (69.6)	20.5 (68.9)	19.1 (66.4)	17.5 (63.5)	16.0 (60.8)	15.6 (60.1)	15.1 (59.2)	15.8 (60.4)	16.3 (61.3)	16.8 (62.2)	19.5 (67.1)	15.1 (59.2)
Average precipitation mm (inches)	109.1 (4.30)	101.3 (3.99)	84.1 (3.31)	45.9 (1.81)	21.7 (0.85)	15.3 (0.60)	7.8 (0.31)	7.7 (0.30)	4.7 (0.19)	8.0 (0.31)	18.2 (0.72)	58.5 (2.30)	482.3 (18.99)
Average precipitation days (≥ 1.0 mm)	6.7	6.9	5.6	3.4	2.3	1.4	1.1	1.1	1.0	1.3	2.3	4.3	37.3
Source: Météo France

Climate data for Saint-Paul, (L'Ermitage - Cirad, altitude 147m, 1991–2020 normals, extremes 2002–present)
Month	Jan	Feb	Mar	Apr	May	Jun	Jul	Aug	Sep	Oct	Nov	Dec	Year
Record high °C (°F)	35.4 (95.7)	35.6 (96.1)	35.7 (96.3)	34.6 (94.3)	32.0 (89.6)	30.4 (86.7)	29.6 (85.3)	30.0 (86.0)	30.9 (87.6)	32.4 (90.3)	34.4 (93.9)	36.0 (96.8)	36.0 (96.8)
Mean daily maximum °C (°F)	31.5 (88.7)	31.6 (88.9)	31.3 (88.3)	30.6 (87.1)	28.6 (83.5)	27.1 (80.8)	26.4 (79.5)	26.7 (80.1)	27.3 (81.1)	28.6 (83.5)	29.9 (85.8)	31.4 (88.5)	29.2 (84.6)
Daily mean °C (°F)	27.0 (80.6)	27.0 (80.6)	26.5 (79.7)	25.7 (78.3)	23.8 (74.8)	22.3 (72.1)	21.5 (70.7)	21.6 (70.9)	22.2 (72.0)	23.5 (74.3)	24.9 (76.8)	26.5 (79.7)	24.4 (75.9)
Mean daily minimum °C (°F)	22.4 (72.3)	22.4 (72.3)	21.8 (71.2)	20.8 (69.4)	19.0 (66.2)	17.4 (63.3)	16.6 (61.9)	16.6 (61.9)	17.2 (63.0)	18.4 (65.1)	19.9 (67.8)	21.5 (70.7)	19.5 (67.1)
Record low °C (°F)	19.2 (66.6)	19.2 (66.6)	18.0 (64.4)	17.5 (63.5)	14.1 (57.4)	13.3 (55.9)	13.1 (55.6)	12.8 (55.0)	14.2 (57.6)	13.1 (55.6)	16.1 (61.0)	18.4 (65.1)	12.8 (55.0)
Average precipitation mm (inches)	138.4 (5.45)	117.3 (4.62)	112.6 (4.43)	54.6 (2.15)	25.1 (0.99)	21.8 (0.86)	8.3 (0.33)	9.3 (0.37)	7.4 (0.29)	10.7 (0.42)	28.4 (1.12)	63.8 (2.51)	597.7 (23.53)
Average precipitation days (≥ 1.0 mm)	8.8	8.2	7.0	4.3	2.9	1.8	1.3	1.2	1.5	1.9	3.1	5.6	47.5
Source: Météo-France

Climate data for Saint-Paul (Bois de Nefles, altitude 595m, 1991–2020 normals, extremes 2002–present)
Month	Jan	Feb	Mar	Apr	May	Jun	Jul	Aug	Sep	Oct	Nov	Dec	Year
Record high °C (°F)	34.4 (93.9)	34.0 (93.2)	33.3 (91.9)	31.5 (88.7)	30.9 (87.6)	28.7 (83.7)	28.6 (83.5)	28.4 (83.1)	29.5 (85.1)	30.8 (87.4)	32.3 (90.1)	33.6 (92.5)	34.4 (93.9)
Mean daily maximum °C (°F)	28.7 (83.7)	28.7 (83.7)	28.4 (83.1)	27.9 (82.2)	26.5 (79.7)	24.9 (76.8)	24.0 (75.2)	24.0 (75.2)	24.1 (75.4)	25.1 (77.2)	26.4 (79.5)	28.0 (82.4)	26.4 (79.5)
Daily mean °C (°F)	23.8 (74.8)	23.9 (75.0)	23.6 (74.5)	22.7 (72.9)	21.1 (70.0)	19.4 (66.9)	18.5 (65.3)	18.4 (65.1)	18.7 (65.7)	19.8 (67.6)	21.2 (70.2)	22.8 (73.0)	21.2 (70.2)
Mean daily minimum °C (°F)	19.0 (66.2)	19.2 (66.6)	18.7 (65.7)	17.6 (63.7)	15.7 (60.3)	13.9 (57.0)	13.0 (55.4)	12.9 (55.2)	13.3 (55.9)	14.5 (58.1)	16.0 (60.8)	17.7 (63.9)	16.0 (60.8)
Record low °C (°F)	15.7 (60.3)	15.3 (59.5)	15.5 (59.9)	13.8 (56.8)	11.6 (52.9)	10.9 (51.6)	9.6 (49.3)	9.8 (49.6)	10.4 (50.7)	8.8 (47.8)	11.8 (53.2)	14.2 (57.6)	8.8 (47.8)
Average precipitation mm (inches)	252.2 (9.93)	249.7 (9.83)	175.4 (6.91)	74.0 (2.91)	39.8 (1.57)	23.0 (0.91)	13.0 (0.51)	15.1 (0.59)	20.9 (0.82)	23.3 (0.92)	53.3 (2.10)	123.9 (4.88)	1,063.6 (41.87)
Average precipitation days (≥ 1.0 mm)	13.3	12.9	11.1	7.0	5.4	2.8	2.5	3.0	3.4	3.7	6.3	9.9	81.3
Source: Météo-France

Climate data for Saint-Paul (Piton-Maido, altitude 2150m, 1991–2020 averages, extremes 1998−present)
Month	Jan	Feb	Mar	Apr	May	Jun	Jul	Aug	Sep	Oct	Nov	Dec	Year
Record high °C (°F)	25.0 (77.0)	22.7 (72.9)	23.1 (73.6)	21.5 (70.7)	20.0 (68.0)	22.4 (72.3)	20.1 (68.2)	22.3 (72.1)	22.0 (71.6)	25.0 (77.0)	23.8 (74.8)	23.7 (74.7)	25.0 (77.0)
Mean daily maximum °C (°F)	17.6 (63.7)	17.8 (64.0)	17.7 (63.9)	17.2 (63.0)	15.5 (59.9)	13.9 (57.0)	13.1 (55.6)	13.4 (56.1)	14.2 (57.6)	15.8 (60.4)	16.4 (61.5)	17.2 (63.0)	15.8 (60.4)
Daily mean °C (°F)	14.6 (58.3)	14.8 (58.6)	14.6 (58.3)	13.8 (56.8)	11.9 (53.4)	10.1 (50.2)	9.3 (48.7)	9.4 (48.9)	10.2 (50.4)	11.8 (53.2)	12.7 (54.9)	13.8 (56.8)	12.3 (54.1)
Mean daily minimum °C (°F)	11.6 (52.9)	11.8 (53.2)	11.5 (52.7)	10.4 (50.7)	8.3 (46.9)	6.3 (43.3)	5.5 (41.9)	5.4 (41.7)	6.2 (43.2)	7.9 (46.2)	9.0 (48.2)	10.3 (50.5)	8.7 (47.7)
Record low °C (°F)	4.1 (39.4)	4.5 (40.1)	5.9 (42.6)	4.0 (39.2)	1.4 (34.5)	−0.6 (30.9)	−0.4 (31.3)	−1.1 (30.0)	0.0 (32.0)	0.7 (33.3)	1.1 (34.0)	4.1 (39.4)	−1.1 (30.0)
Average precipitation mm (inches)	378.6 (14.91)	293.8 (11.57)	280.6 (11.05)	88.9 (3.50)	44.7 (1.76)	32.0 (1.26)	26.6 (1.05)	22.1 (0.87)	29.8 (1.17)	27.0 (1.06)	55.2 (2.17)	126.5 (4.98)	1,405.8 (55.35)
Average precipitation days (≥ 1.0 mm)	14.9	13.5	12.1	8.1	6.3	4.1	3.9	3.3	4.2	3.5	5.9	10.1	89.8
Source: Météo France

== Culture ==
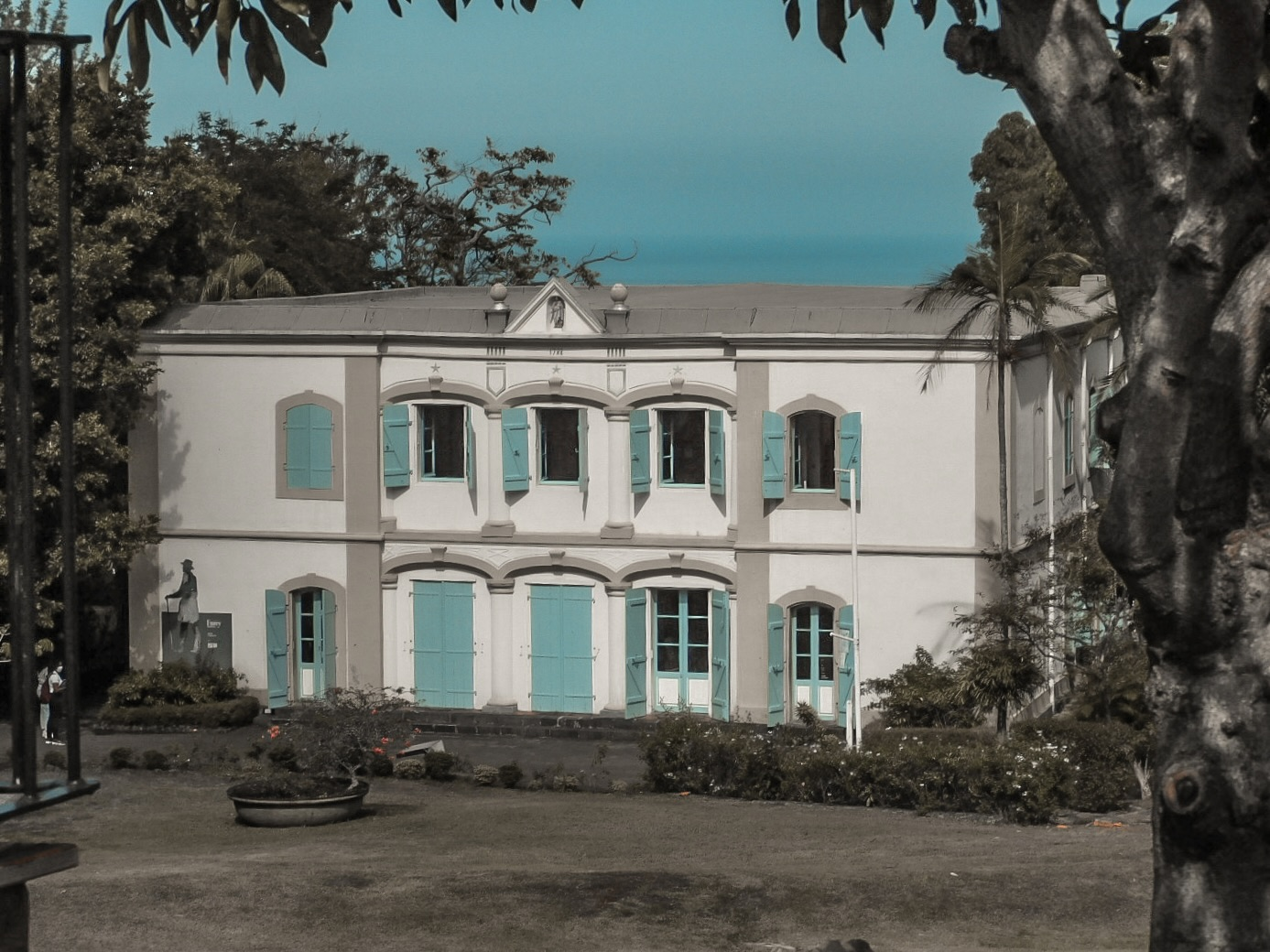
The Masters' house of the Musée de Villèle, on a former colonial plantation

The Musée de Villèle—located on a former colonial plantation—addresses the subject of slavery.

== See also ==
- Communes of the Réunion department
- Saint-Pauloise FC
