= La Possession =

Commune in Réunion, France

- Commune
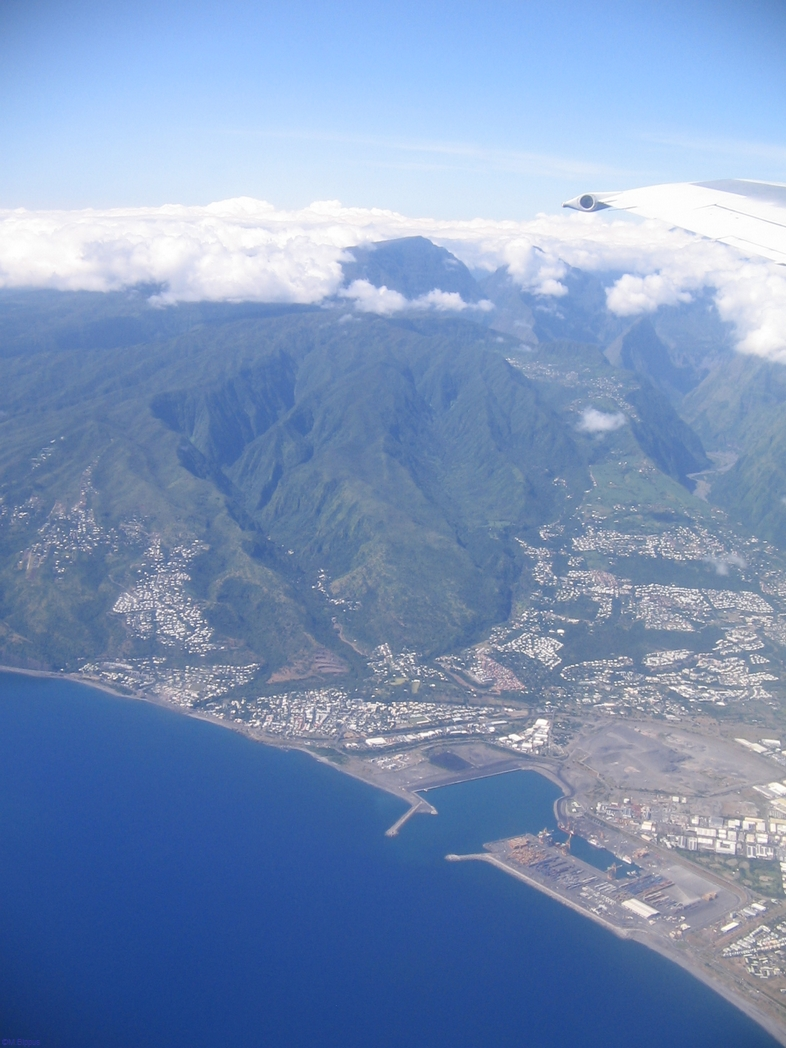
- An aerial view over La Possession and Le Port

- Coat of arms

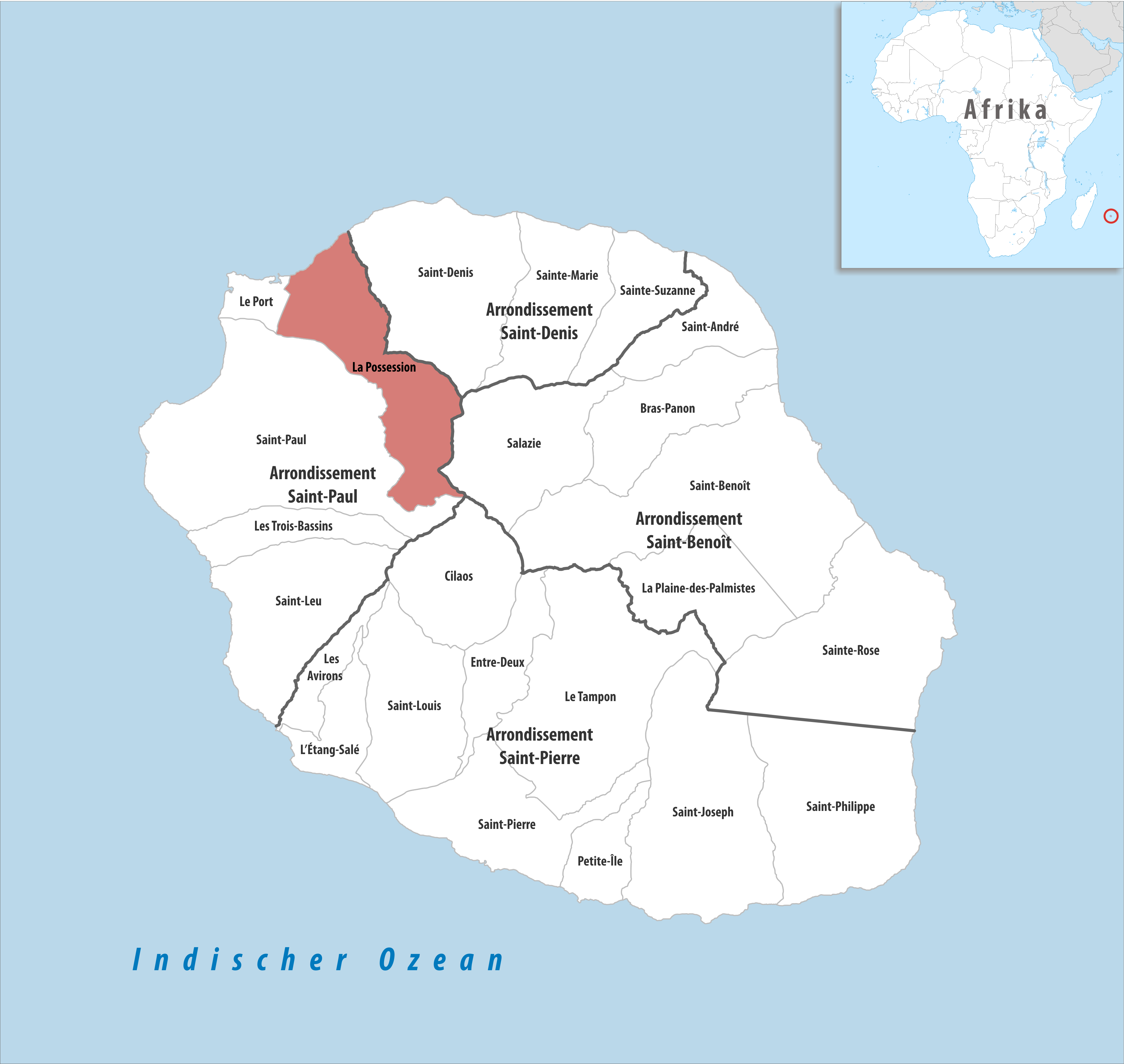
- Location of La Possession
- Coordinates: 20°55′35″S 55°20′09″E
- Country: France
- Overseas region and department: Réunion
- Arrondissement: Saint-Paul
- Canton: La Possession
- Intercommunality: Territoire de la Côte Ouest

Government
  - Mayor (2020–2026): Vanessa Miranville
- Area^{1}: 118.35 km^{2} (45.70 sq mi)
- Elevation: 17 m (56 ft)
- Highest elevation: 2,940 m (9,650 ft)
- Lowest elevation: 0 m (0 ft)
- Population (2023): 36,568
  - Density: 308.98/km^{2} (800.26/sq mi)
- Time zone: UTC+04:00
- INSEE/Postal code: 97408 /97419
- ^{1} French Land Register data, which excludes lakes, ponds, glaciers > 1 km^{2} (0.386 sq mi or 247 acres) and river estuaries.

La Possession (French pronunciation: [la pɔsesjɔ̃]) is a commune in the French overseas department of Réunion. It is located in the northwestern part of the island of Réunion, between the capital of Saint-Denis and the commune of Le Port.

To the territory of this commune belongs the major part of the Cirque of Mafate, a caldera of the dormant Piton des Neiges volcano. It is part of the Réunion National Park.

== History ==
The territory of the commune of La Possession belonged to the commune of Saint-Paul until 1895.

In 1675, the first settlements were led by Jean Marquet (a creek was named for him). In 1699, sugar cane concessions were attributed to Texer de Mota, a Portuguese from India.

From 1730-1767, construction of Chemin Crémont created the first paved walkway to the capital Saint-Denis. In 1797, the Rivière des Galets concession was attributed to Dr Rivière.

In 1833, a chapel was constructed, later replaced by a church. 1834: Still belonging to the commune of Saint-Paul, Réunion, the territory of the future commune becomes a special section. From 1849–1854, La route de la Montagne (Mountain road) was built; the first reliable road connection to Saint-Denis.

In 1860, the lazaret of La Grande Chaloupe was constructed, which became the quarantine station of Réunion. In 1882 the railway Saint-Denis - Saint-Pierre and the harbour of Le Port were constructed. In 1886 the first steamers enter the new Pointe des Galets harbour. 1890 saw the creation of the La Possession commune. In 1895, part of the territory at the Pointe des Galets was split off to become the commune of Le Port.

The new coastal highway to Saint-Denis was built between 1956 and 1963.

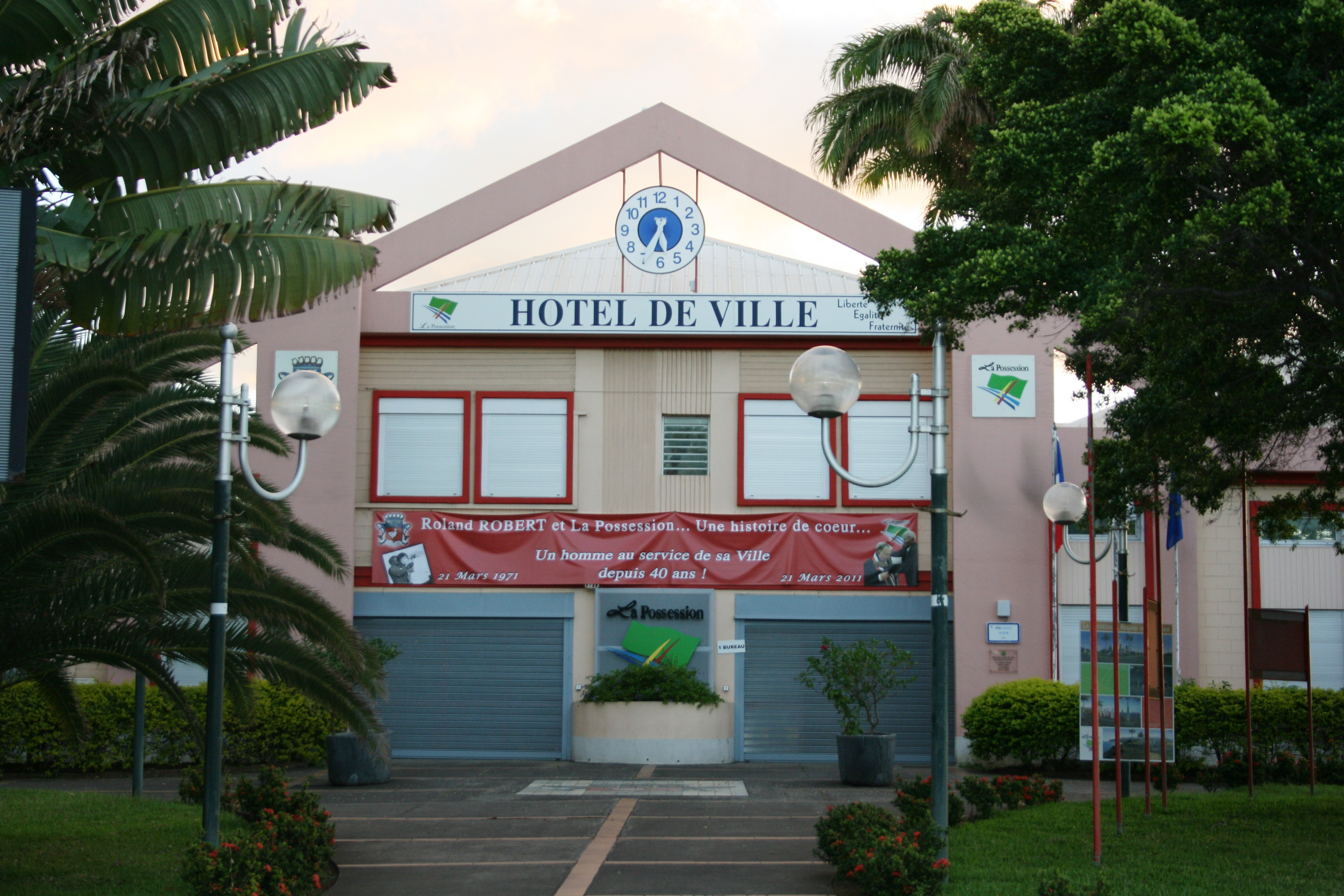
The Hôtel de Ville

The Hôtel de Ville was completed in 1967 and enlarged in 1975.

== Demographics ==
Historical population
Year	Pop.	±% p.a.
1961	6,783	—
1967	7,626	+1.97%
1974	10,112	+4.11%
1982	11,002	+1.06%
1990	15,614	+4.47%
1999	21,904	+3.83%
2007	27,175	+2.73%
2012	30,653	+2.44%
2017	33,020	+1.50%
2023	36,568	+1.72%
Source: SPLAF and INSEE (1967-2023)

== Geography ==
Most of the caldera of Mafate belongs to the commune. Hiking trails connect Dos d'Âne via the river valley of Rivière des Galets to Grand Place and other îlets. Other trails connect La Possession to Saint-Denis, via La Grande Chaloupe.

At La Grande Chaloupe the partly restored lazaretto and the former train station can be visited. They have exhibitions about the history of the Réunion railroad, the lazaretto and indentured servitude in Réunion.

=== Climate ===
La Possession has a subtropical highland climate (Köppen climate classification Cwb). The average annual temperature in La Possession is 18.1 °C (64.6 °F). The average annual rainfall is 1,376.0 mm (54.17 in) with February as the wettest month. The temperatures are highest on average in February, at around 21.6 °C (70.9 °F), and lowest in July, at around 14.7 °C (58.5 °F). The highest temperature ever recorded in La Possession was 31.4 °C (88.5 °F) on 2 March 2010; the coldest temperature ever recorded was 4.5 °C (40.1 °F) on 29 July 1986.

Climate data for La Possession (Dos d'Ane, altitude 915m, 1991–2020 normals, extremes 1966–2014)
Month	Jan	Feb	Mar	Apr	May	Jun	Jul	Aug	Sep	Oct	Nov	Dec	Year
Record high °C (°F)	30.2 (86.4)	30.8 (87.4)	31.4 (88.5)	29.5 (85.1)	28.5 (83.3)	26.9 (80.4)	25.4 (77.7)	25.6 (78.1)	26.5 (79.7)	28.6 (83.5)	30.2 (86.4)	31.1 (88.0)	31.4 (88.5)
Mean daily maximum °C (°F)	25.7 (78.3)	25.8 (78.4)	25.4 (77.7)	24.3 (75.7)	22.9 (73.2)	21.0 (69.8)	19.8 (67.6)	20.1 (68.2)	20.5 (68.9)	21.6 (70.9)	23.1 (73.6)	24.7 (76.5)	22.9 (73.2)
Daily mean °C (°F)	21.3 (70.3)	21.6 (70.9)	20.9 (69.6)	19.7 (67.5)	18.1 (64.6)	15.9 (60.6)	14.7 (58.5)	15.0 (59.0)	15.4 (59.7)	16.6 (61.9)	18.1 (64.6)	20.0 (68.0)	18.1 (64.6)
Mean daily minimum °C (°F)	16.9 (62.4)	17.3 (63.1)	16.5 (61.7)	15.0 (59.0)	13.3 (55.9)	10.9 (51.6)	9.7 (49.5)	9.9 (49.8)	10.4 (50.7)	11.5 (52.7)	13.1 (55.6)	15.2 (59.4)	13.3 (55.9)
Record low °C (°F)	11.5 (52.7)	12.0 (53.6)	11.0 (51.8)	8.9 (48.0)	8.0 (46.4)	5.4 (41.7)	4.5 (40.1)	6.0 (42.8)	5.7 (42.3)	6.8 (44.2)	7.2 (45.0)	10.5 (50.9)	4.5 (40.1)
Average precipitation mm (inches)	343.4 (13.52)	343.5 (13.52)	241.1 (9.49)	80.6 (3.17)	48.5 (1.91)	28.5 (1.12)	14.4 (0.57)	20.8 (0.82)	22.6 (0.89)	27.0 (1.06)	52.2 (2.06)	153.4 (6.04)	1,376 (54.17)
Average precipitation days (≥ 1.0 mm)	14.2	13.5	11.6	8.3	6.2	3.5	3.4	3.6	4.1	4.7	6.6	10.2	90.0
Source: Météo-France

== Education ==
Three collèges and one lycée support the commune:

- Collège Jean Albany, with 1130 students (2005)
- Collège Texeira da Motta.
- Collège R.Verges, with 740 students (2005)
- Lycée Moulin Joli, with 1060 students (2006)

== Sister cities ==
- Port Louis (Mauritius)
- Villeneuve-d'Ascq (Metropolitan-France)
- Antanifotsy (Madagascar)
- Foshan (China)
- Barakani (Anjouan - Comoros)

== Gallery ==
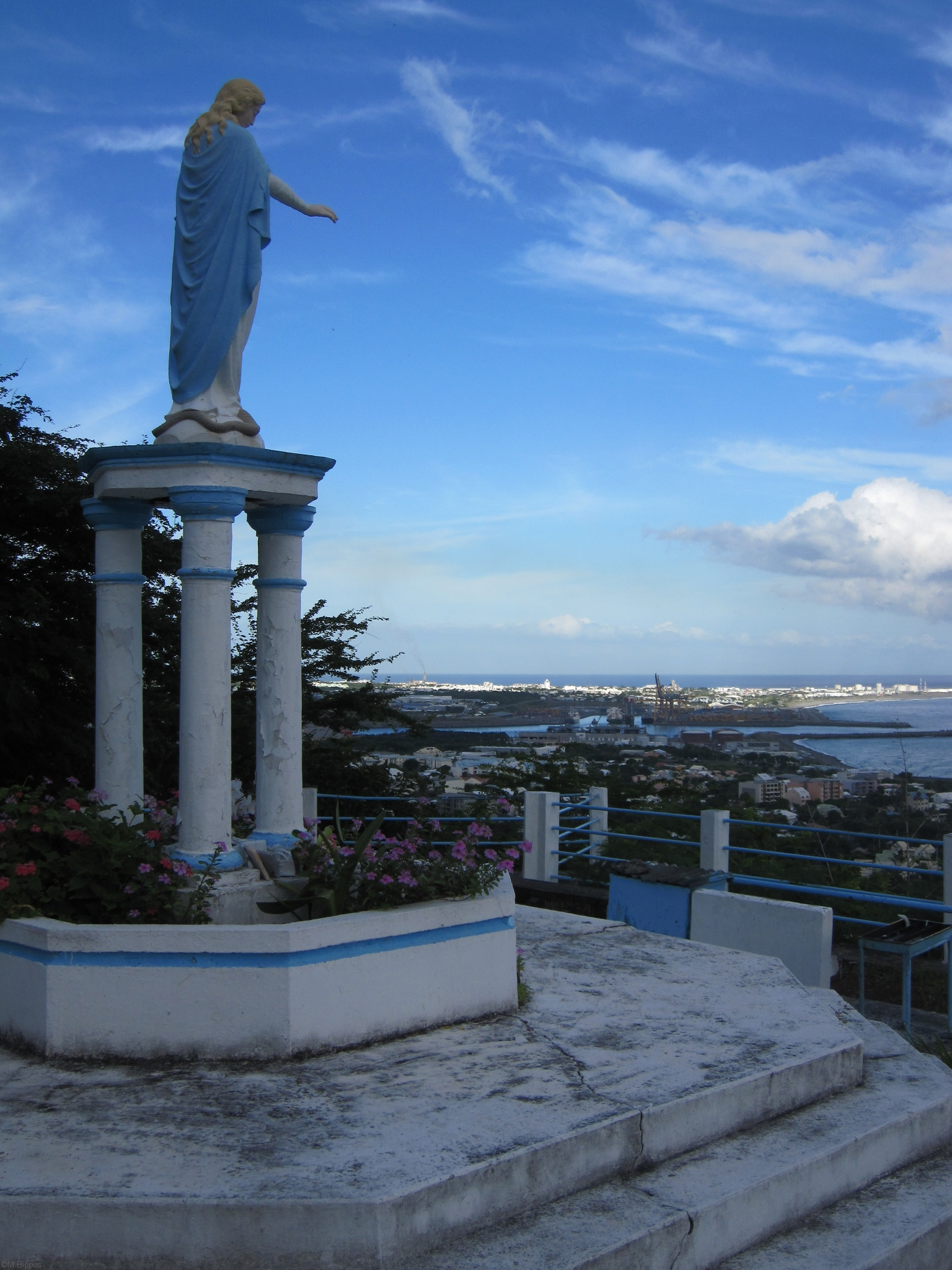

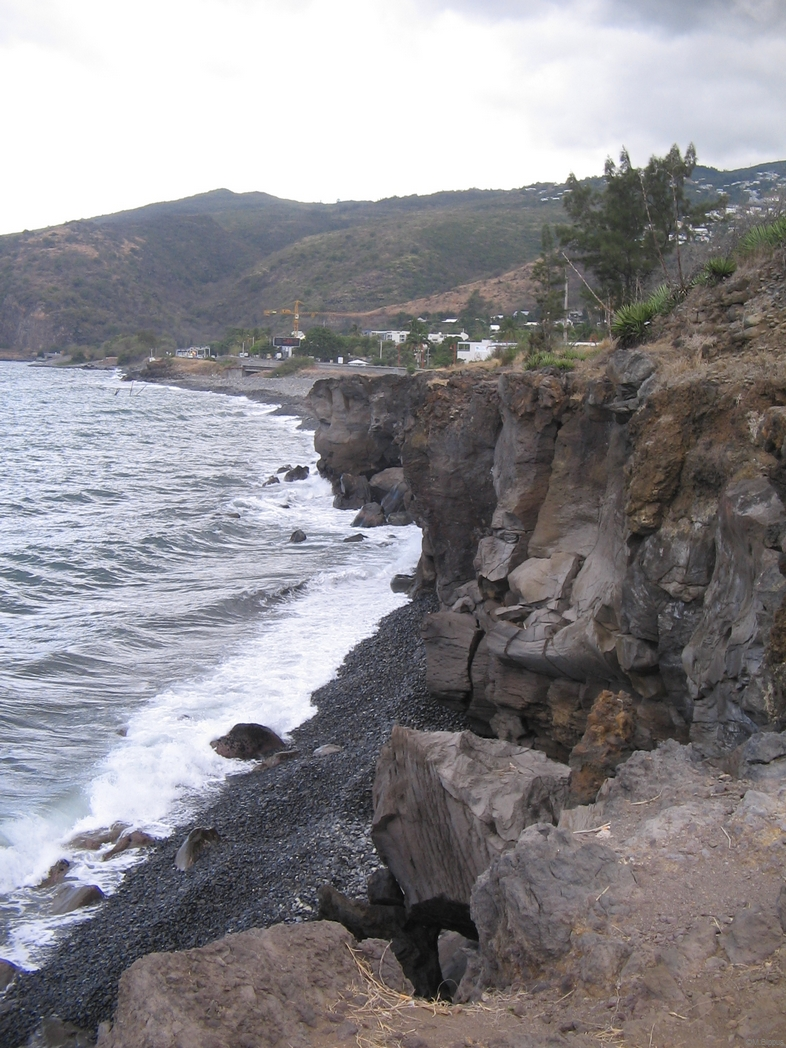
Coastline

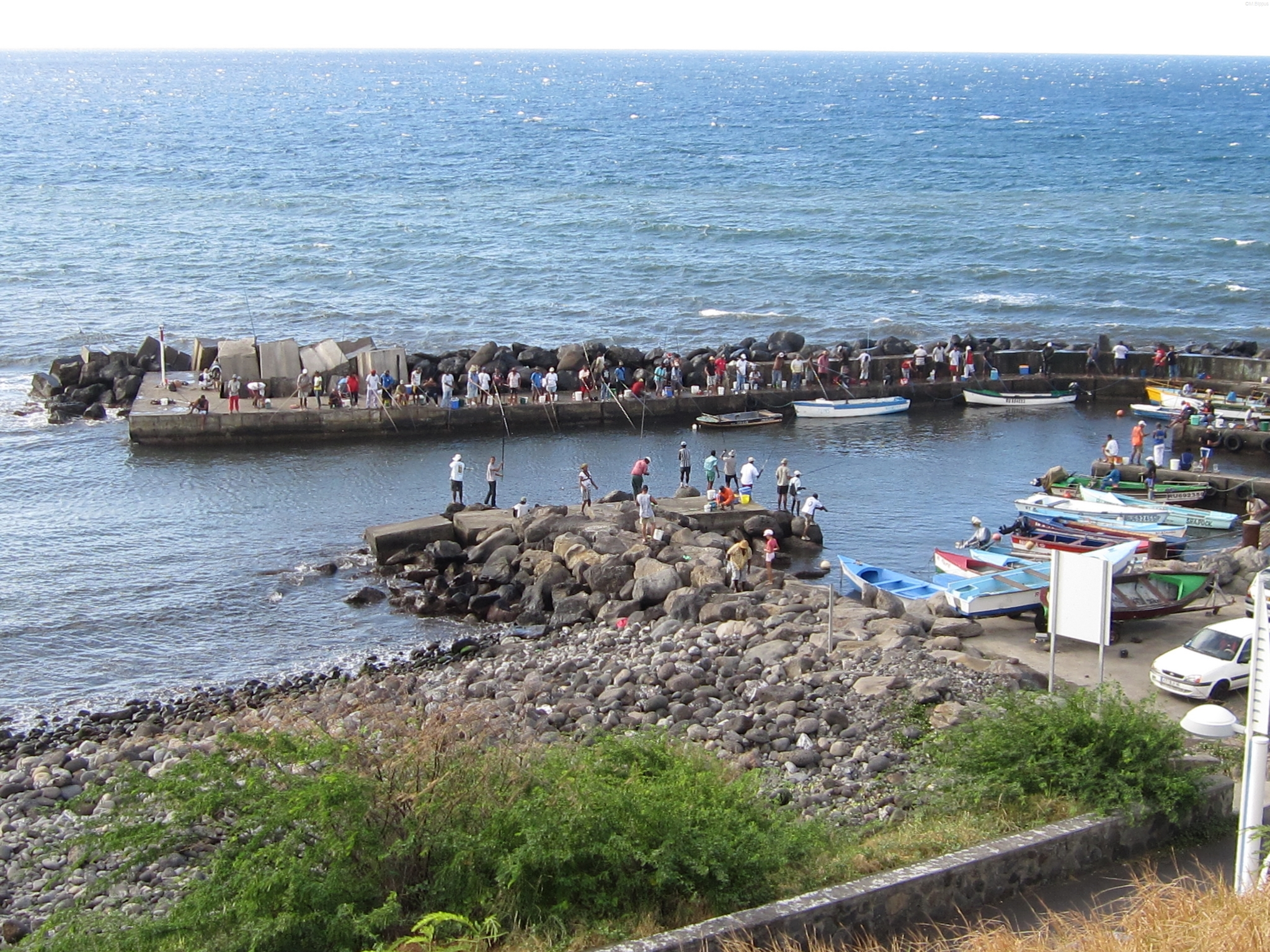
Coastline

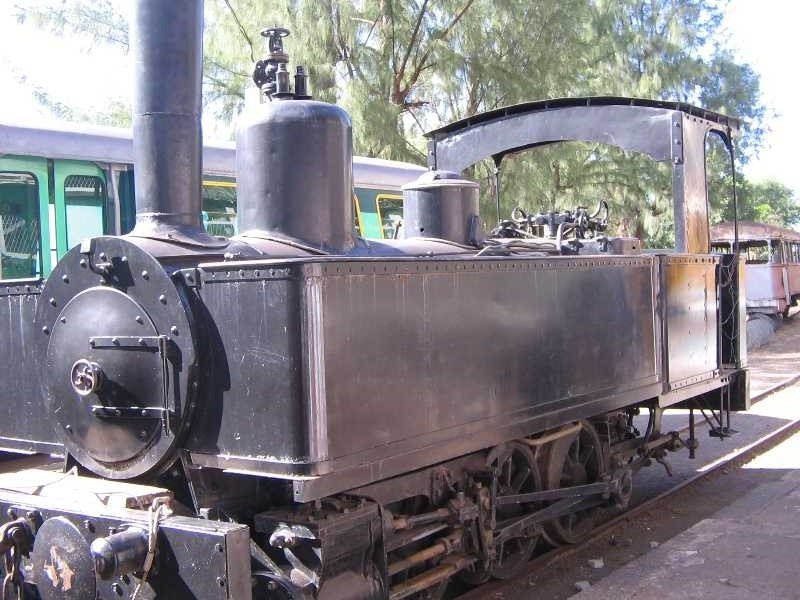
Steam locomotive at the railroad station

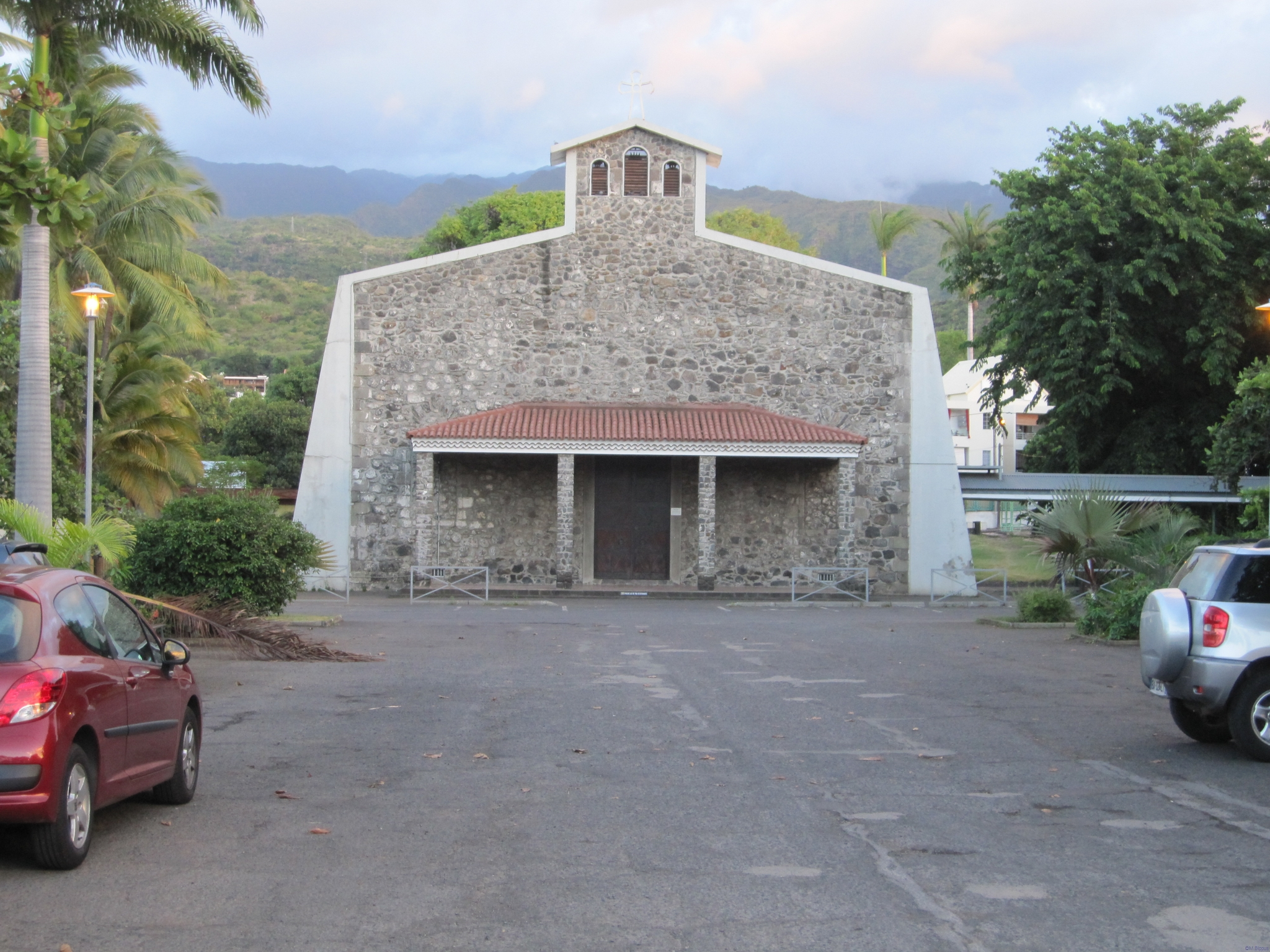
church

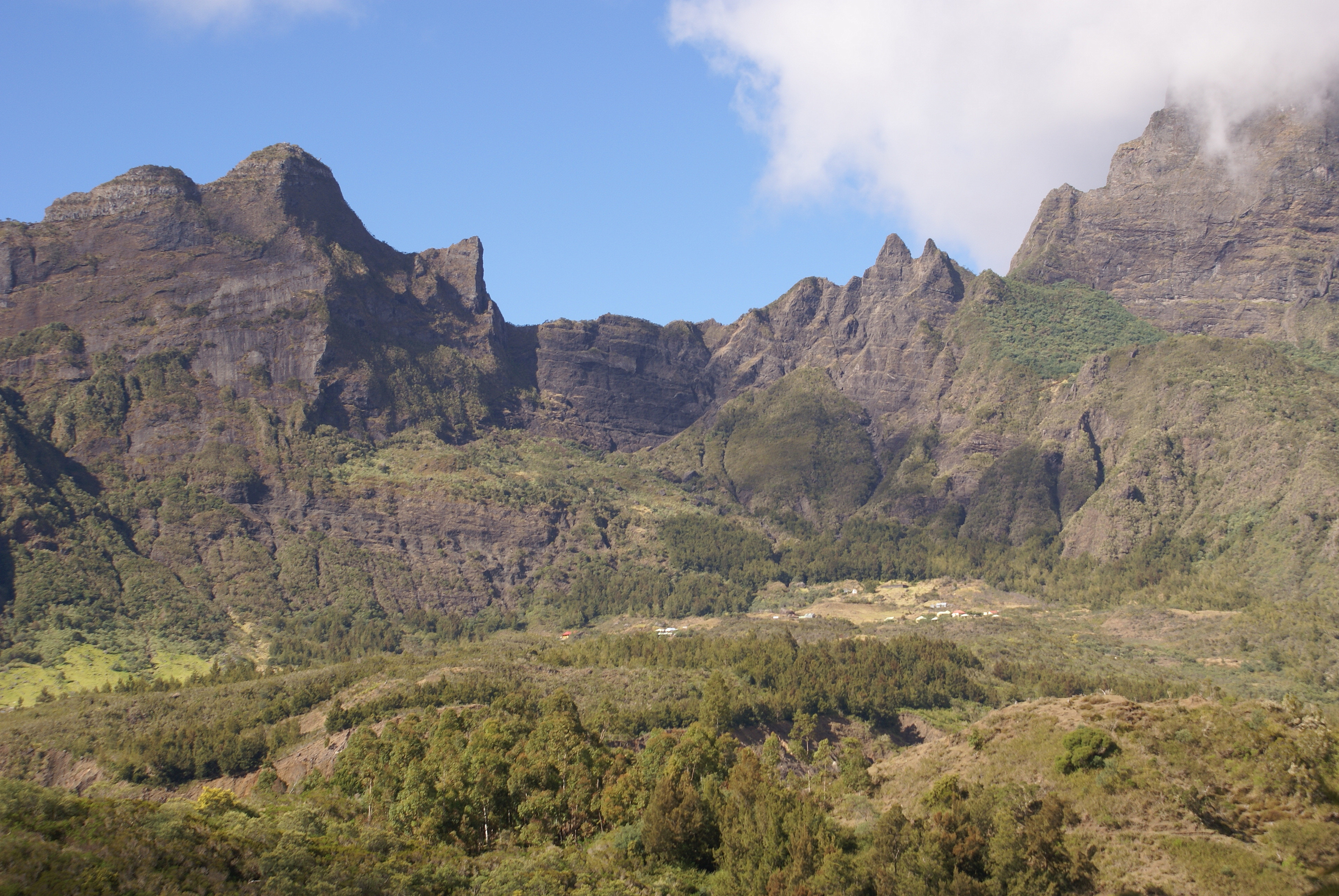
Mafate caldera

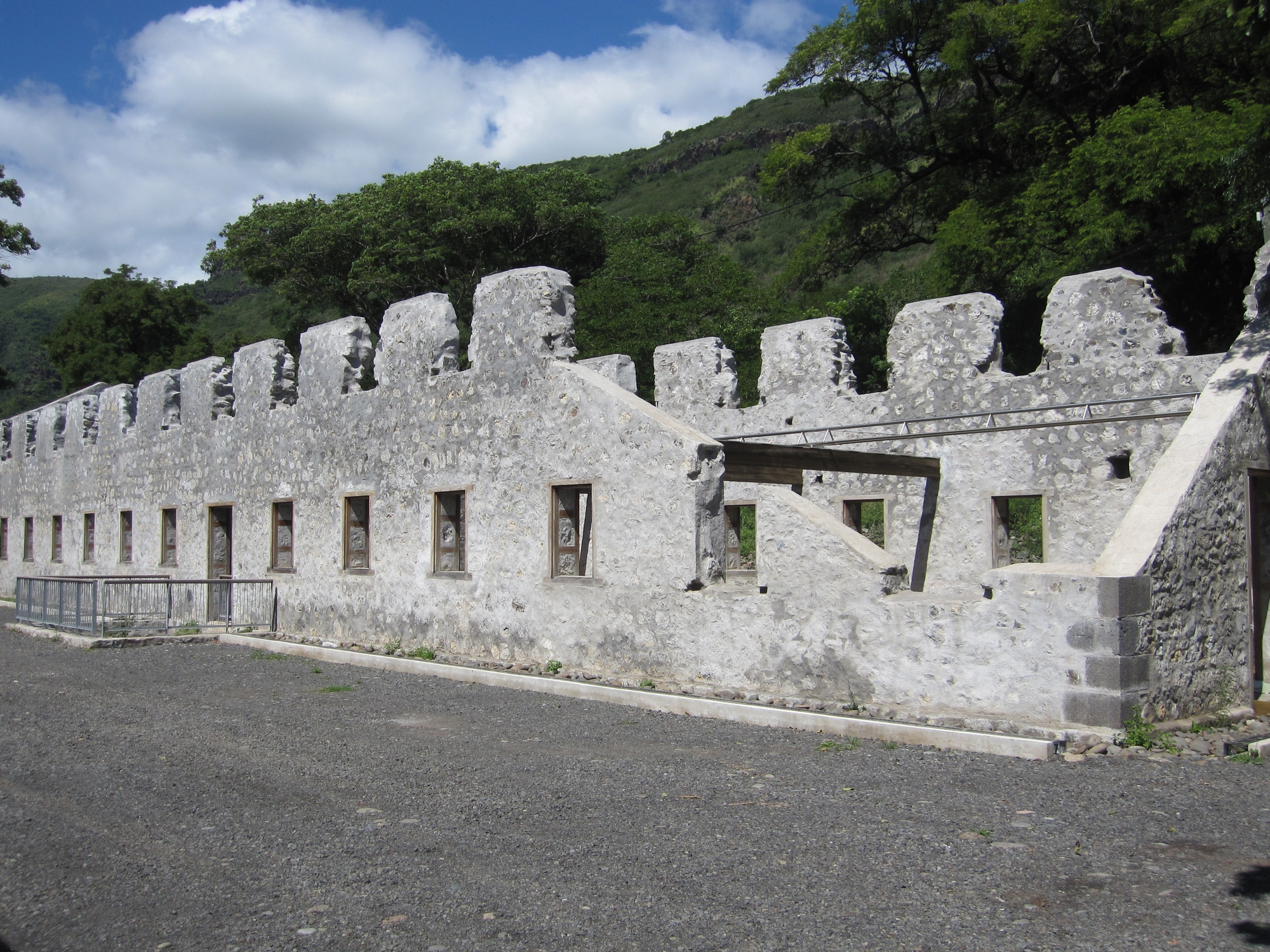
Lazaretto of Grande Chaloupe

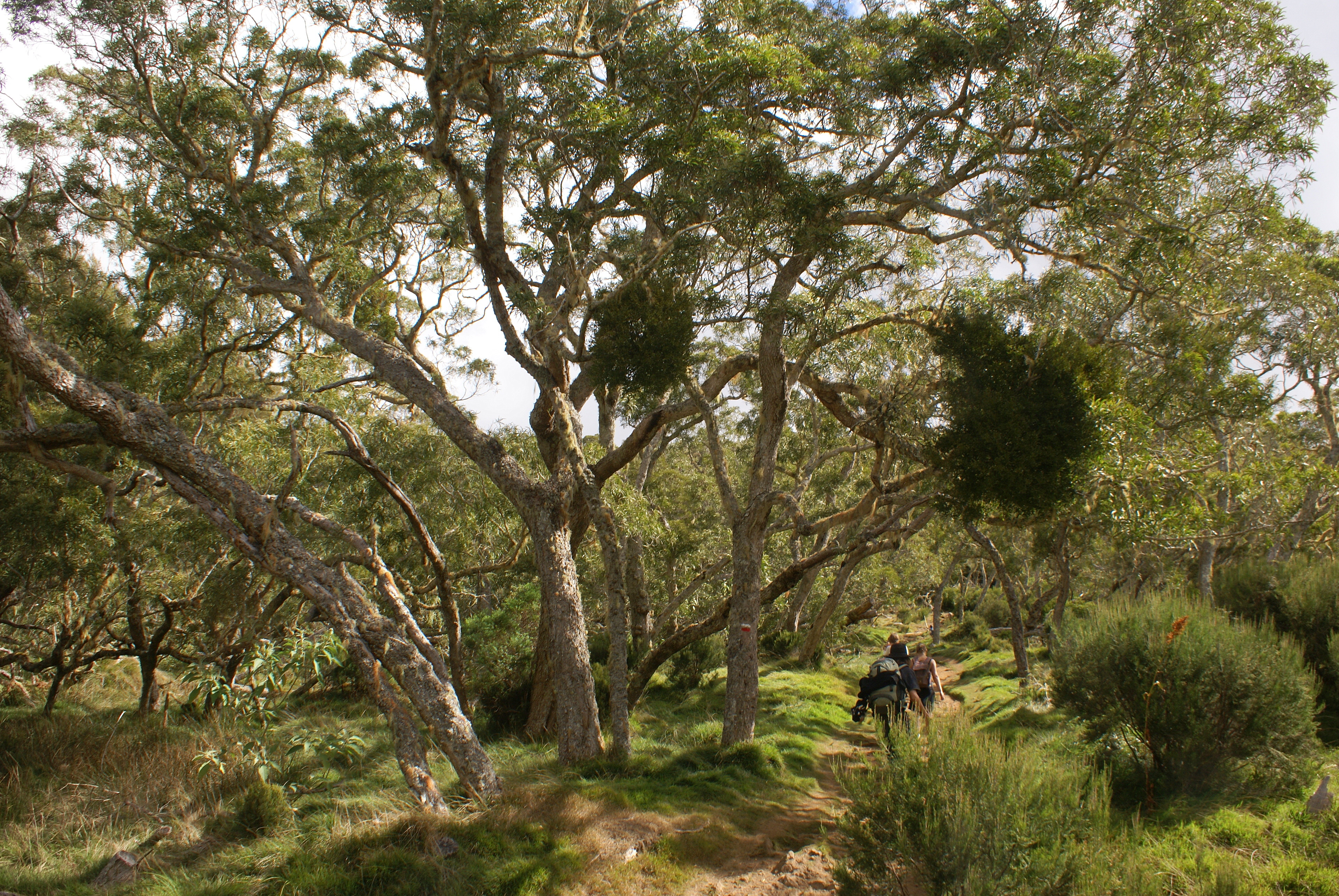
Hiking in Mafate

== See also ==
- Communes of the Réunion department
- Mafate valley and caldera
- La Grande Chaloupe
