= Grand Place, Réunion =

Grand Place Grann Place
- Village
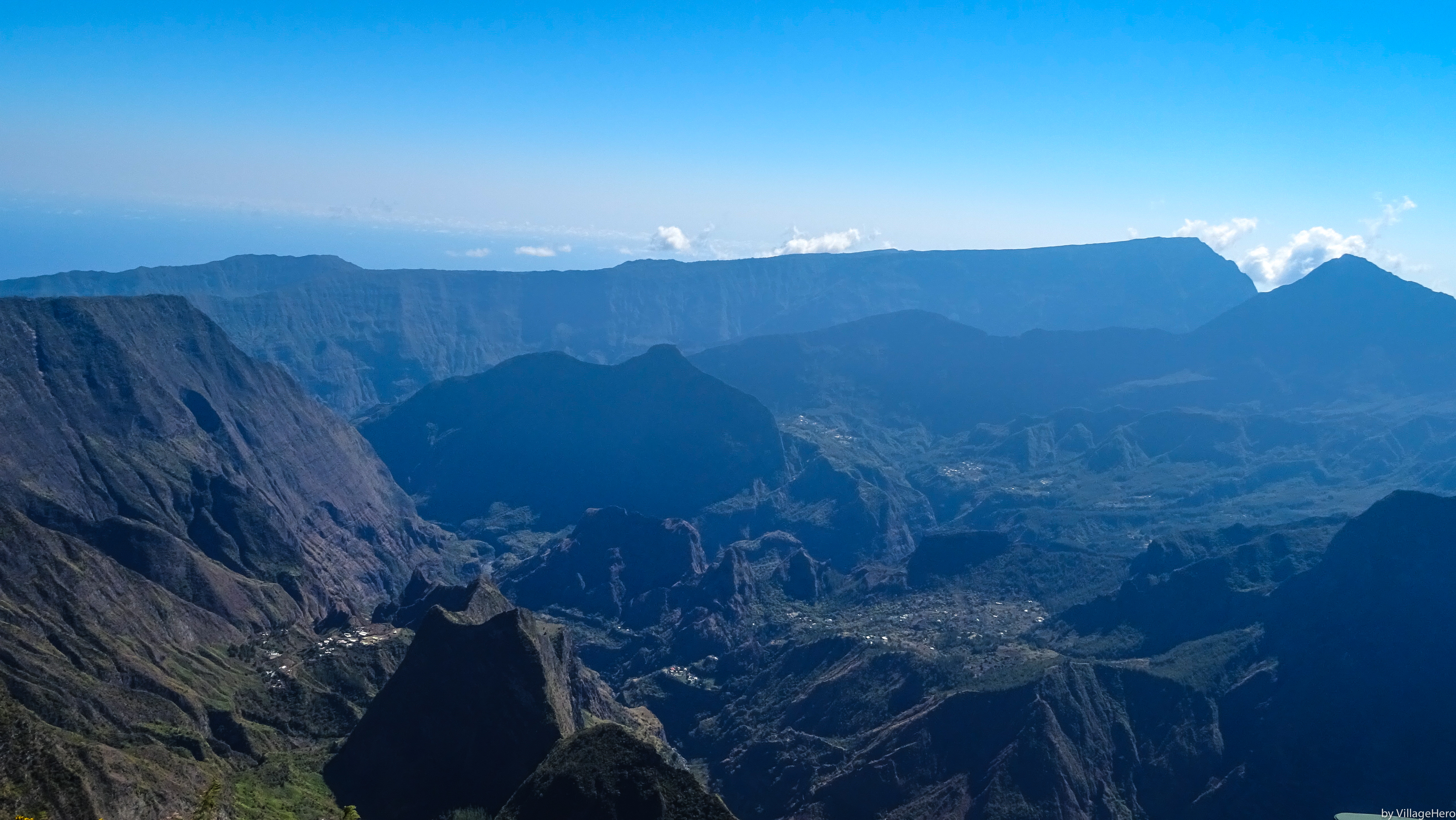
- Cirque de Mafate with Grand Place (settlement on the bottom right)

- Location in La Réunion
- Coordinates: 21°02′37″S 55°24′43″E
- Country: France
- Department: La Réunion
- Commune: La Possession
- Elevation (Cayenne): 550 m (1,800 ft)

Population
  - Total: ca. 130

Grand Place is a village in the commune La Possession in the French overseas department of La Réunion, an island in the Indian Ocean. The hamlet (fr. îlet = little island) is situated in the Cirque de Mafate, a caldera of the Piton des Neiges volcano, which is part of the Réunion National Park. It is accessible only on foot or by helicopter.

== Village structure ==
Grand Place is one of the settlements in the Mafate cirque with the largest surface area and stretches on a sloped plane that reaches from 520 m up to ~1000 m in the shadow of Piton Calumet (height 1616 m). Therefore it may be separated into three "districts":

- Grand Place les Hauts,
- Grand Place École,
- Grand Place les Bas aka "Cayenne".

Nearby, the Rivière des Galets flows northward and drains the caldera.

The îlet's small church Notre Dame de Lourdes is located in Cayenne. The current building had been rebuilt and inaugurated in 1970. The little belltower carries a bell which seems to be cast with the inscription "Jesus, Maria, Joseph" in 1745.

== Education ==
The first school (and then the only one in Mafate) was erected in Cayenne in 1923, but this building is no longer in use, although it is still standing. In 1996 the small elementary school Leonard Thomas was established in Grand Place École. It has a capacity of 10-20 pupils which originate not only from Grand Place itself, but also from nearby hamlets (îlets). The teacher usually stays during the week in a room of the small complex, and there is also a canteen option for the kids to have a warm meal during the lunchbreak.

== Notable people ==
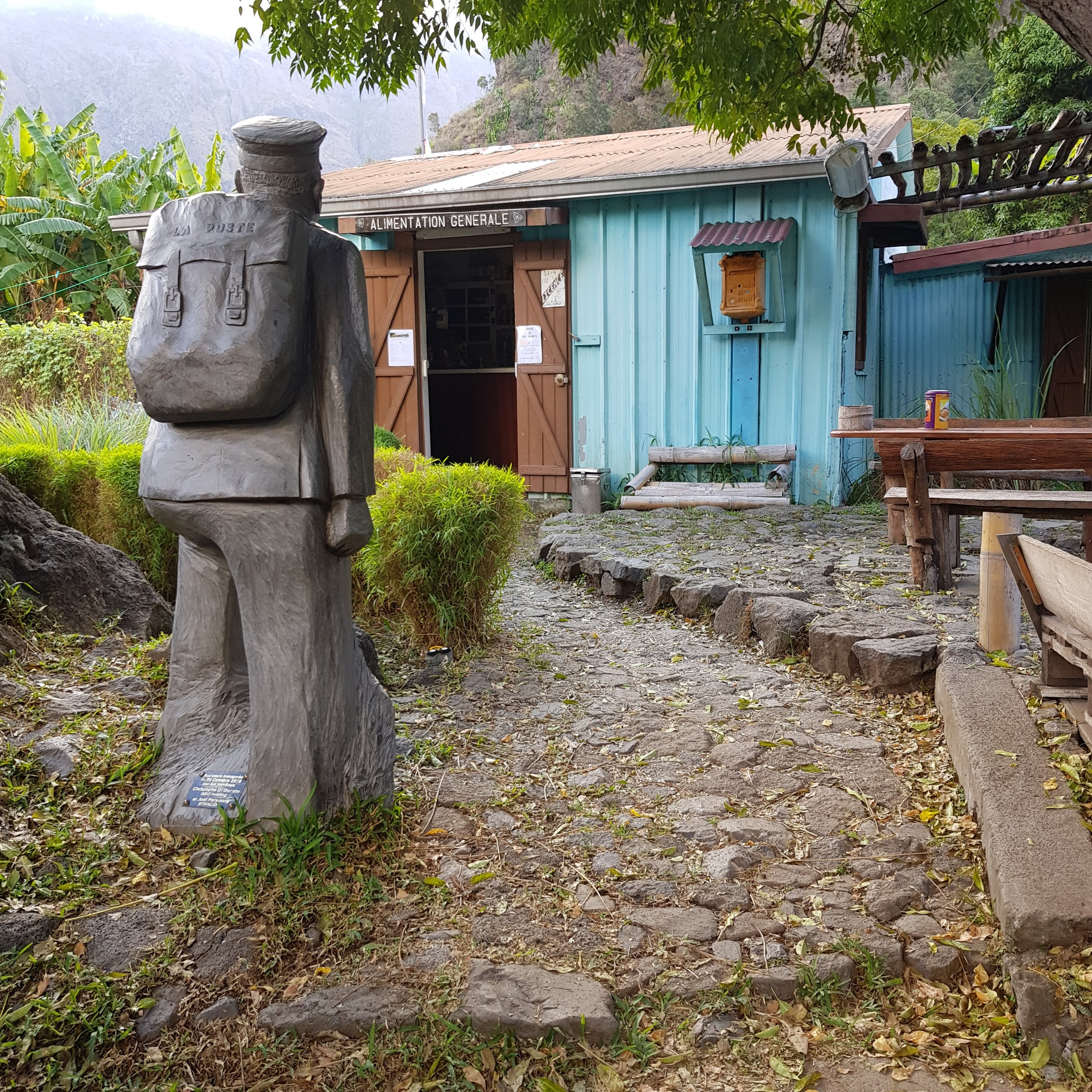
The statue of Yvrin Pausé in postal service outfit looking at the convenience store he founded

A basalt statue of Yvrin Pausé (1928-2019), created by sculptor Marco Ah Kiem, was installed in the village in 2016 to honour the mailman of the Mafate mountains. From 1951-1991 he served the area by foot and walked about a quarter million kilometers in his years of duty. Also the postal sorting center in Le Port bears his name, and he received a medal of merit in 1993 for his accomplishments. Grand Place was his birthplace and where he lived and worked, including a grocery store which he operated with his wife since 1960, and a lodge, Le Bougainvillier, which he opened at age 71.
