= Gros Morne (Réunion) =

Volcano near Cilaos, Réunion

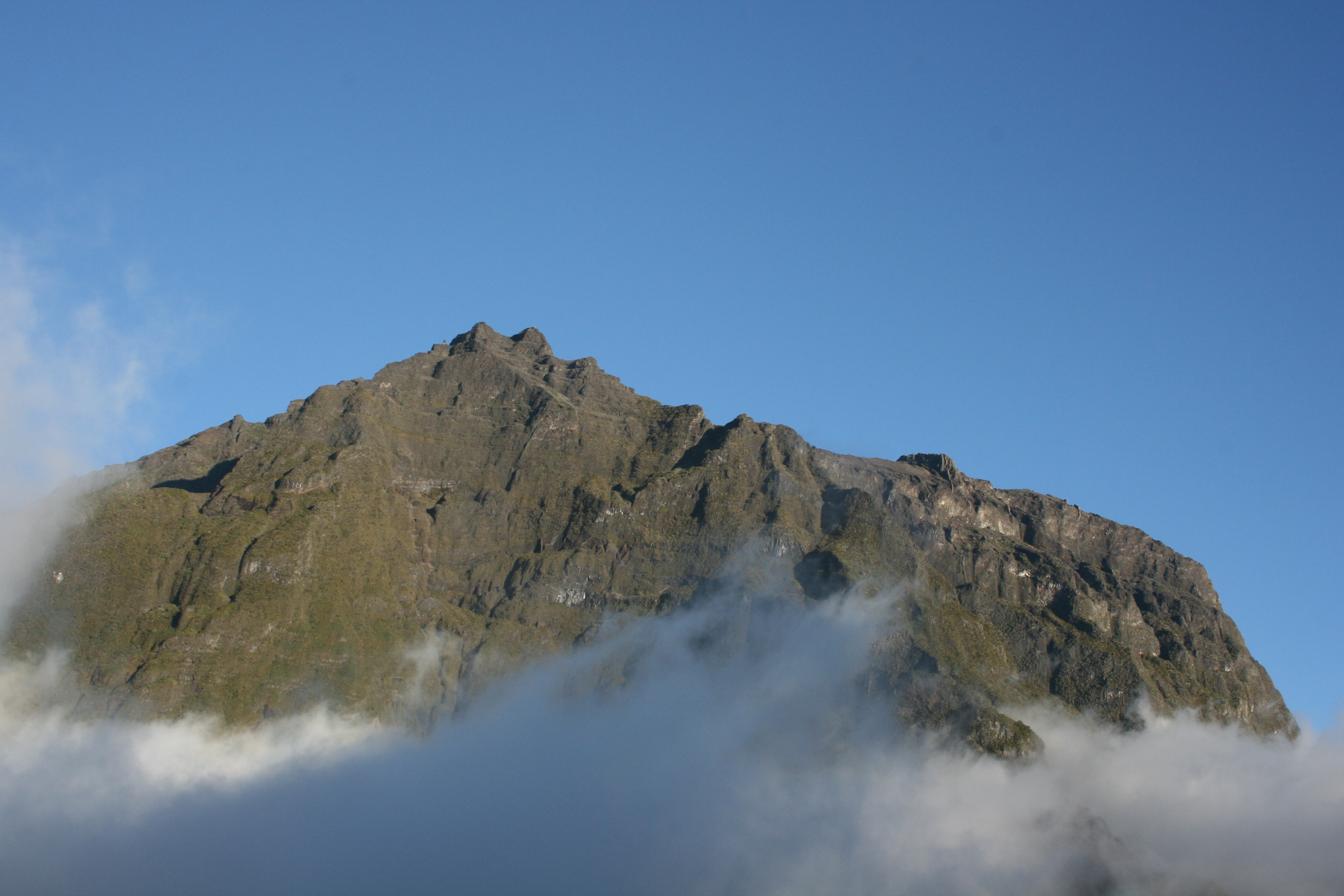
- The Gros Morne seen from Petit Col

Highest point
- Elevation: 3,019 m (9,905 ft)
- Coordinates: 21°05′10″S 55°27′58″E

Naming
- Language of name: French

Geography
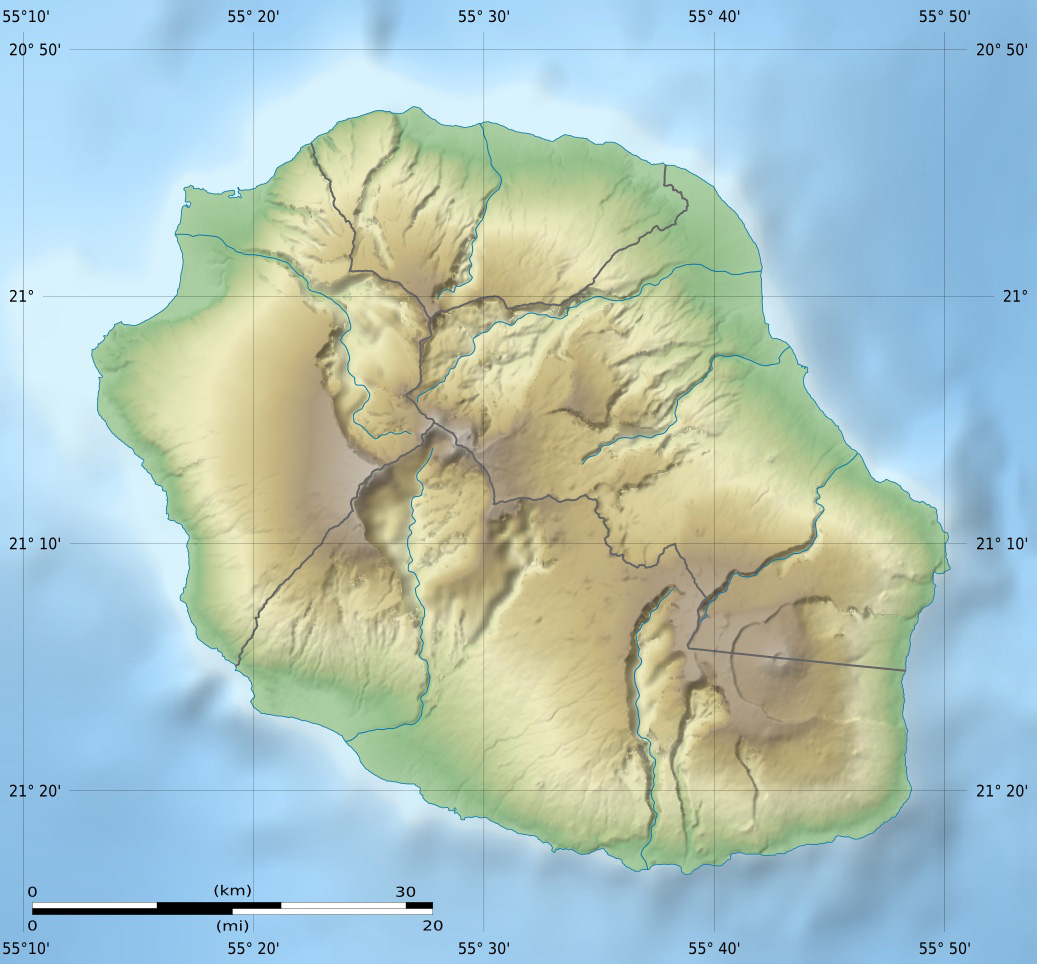
- Location within Réunion
- Location: Réunion, Indian Ocean

The Gros Morne is a volcanic peak on the island of Réunion, located to the north of the town of Cilaos. Lying just to the west of its slightly taller neighbour, the Piton des Neiges, the Gros Morne rises to a height of 3,019 metres (9,905 ft). The Rivière des Galets rises on the peak's western slopes.

== See also ==
- Piton des Neiges – Gros Morne Important Bird Area
