= Piton des Neiges – Gros Morne Important Bird Area =

Coordinates: 21°05′S 55°29′E

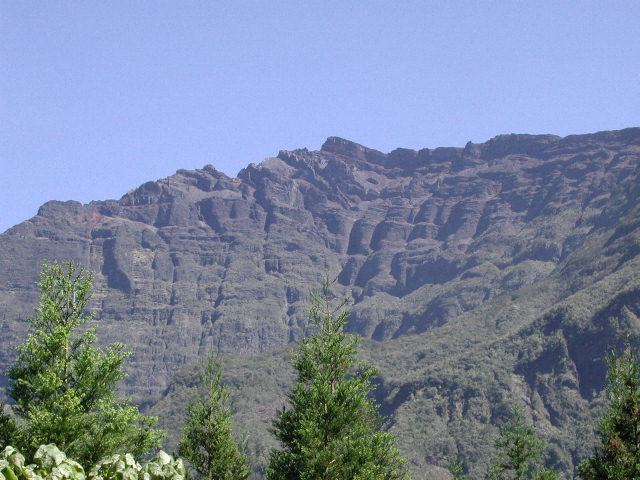
View of the Piton des Neiges – Gros Morne massif from the Cilaos caldera

Piton des Neiges – Gros Morne Important Bird Area is a 2,000-hectare (7.7 sq mi) tract of land on the island of Réunion, a French territory in the western Indian Ocean.

== Description ==
The IBA comprises the Piton des Neiges – Gros Morne volcanic massif, the highest land on Réunion with a peak elevation of over 3000 m and the meeting point of the island's three calderas of Cilaos, Mafate and Salazie. The summit area is mainly bare rock and scree, while the lower parts of the site, from about 2800 m down to 2000 m above sea level, are vegetated with native alpine shrubland. The site has a mountain hut but no permanent inhabitants and is used recreationally by hikers and climbers.

=== Birds ===
The site has been identified by BirdLife International as an Important Bird Area (IBA) because it supports a large breeding colony of Barau's petrels (3000–5000 breeding pairs) as well as populations of Réunion bulbuls, Mascarene white-eyes, Réunion olive white-eyes and Réunion stonechats.
