= Mouth of the Cirque de Salazie Important Bird Area =

Protected area in Réunion

Coordinates: 21°00′S 55°35′E

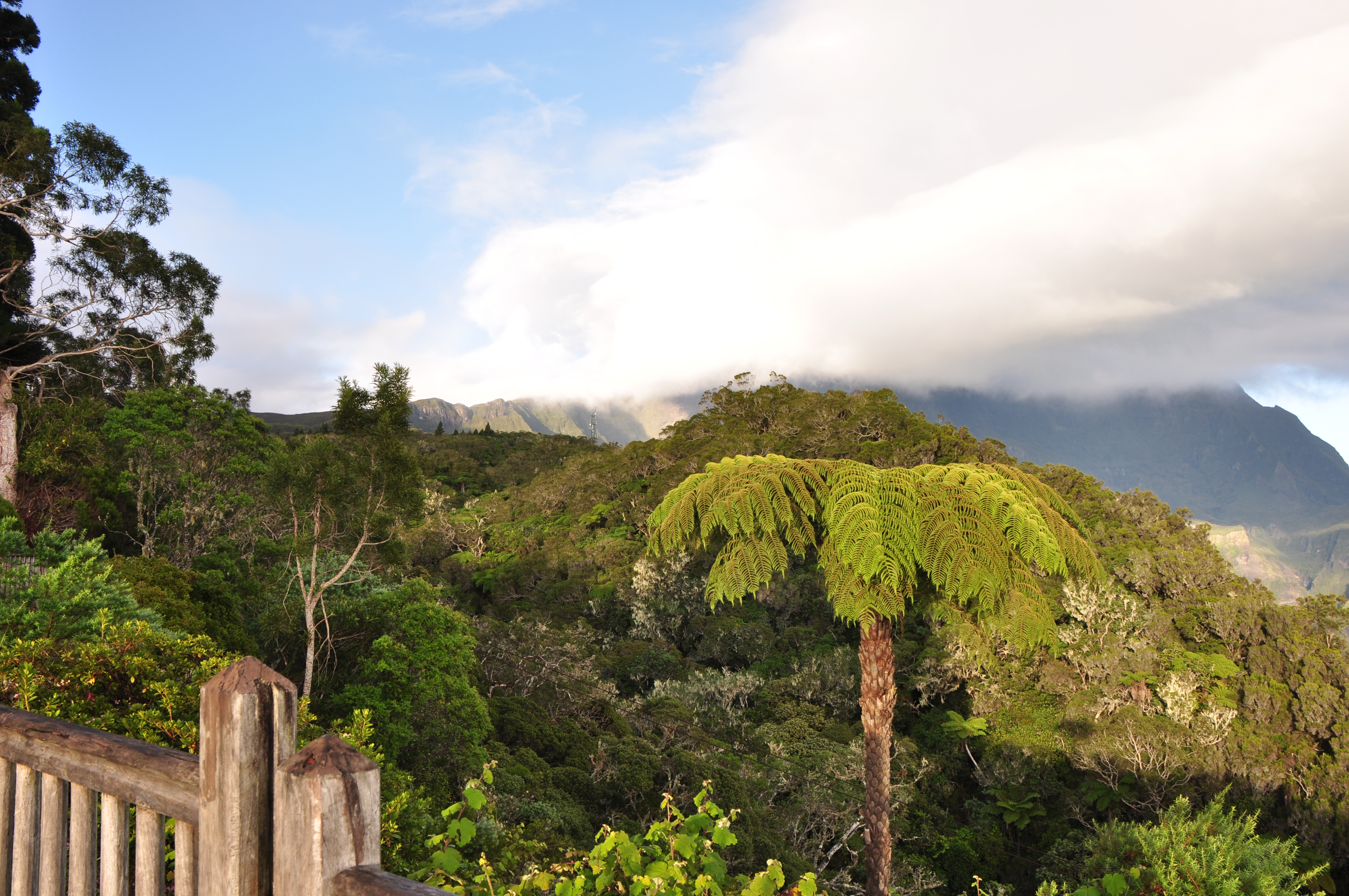
Bélouve forest landscape

Mouth of the Cirque de Salazie Important Bird Area is a 1780 ha tract of land on the island of Réunion, a French territory in the western Indian Ocean.

== Description ==
It lies north-east of the Piton des Neiges volcanic massif, consisting of the river gorges of the Bras de Caverne and Rivière du Mât that drain the forested Bélouve plateau and adjacent Salazie caldera respectively. The site contains stands of native forest in very rugged terrain at elevations ranging from 160 m up to 1430 m above sea level.

=== Birds ===
The site has been identified by BirdLife International as an Important Bird Area (IBA) because it supports a breeding colony of tropical shearwaters (300 breeding pairs) as well as populations of Réunion harriers, Mascarene swiftlets, Mascarene paradise flycatchers, Réunion bulbuls, Mascarene white-eyes, Réunion olive white-eyes and Réunion stonechats.
