= Ravine de la Grande Chaloupe Important Bird Area =

Preotected area in Réunion

Coordinates: 20°54′S 55°23′E

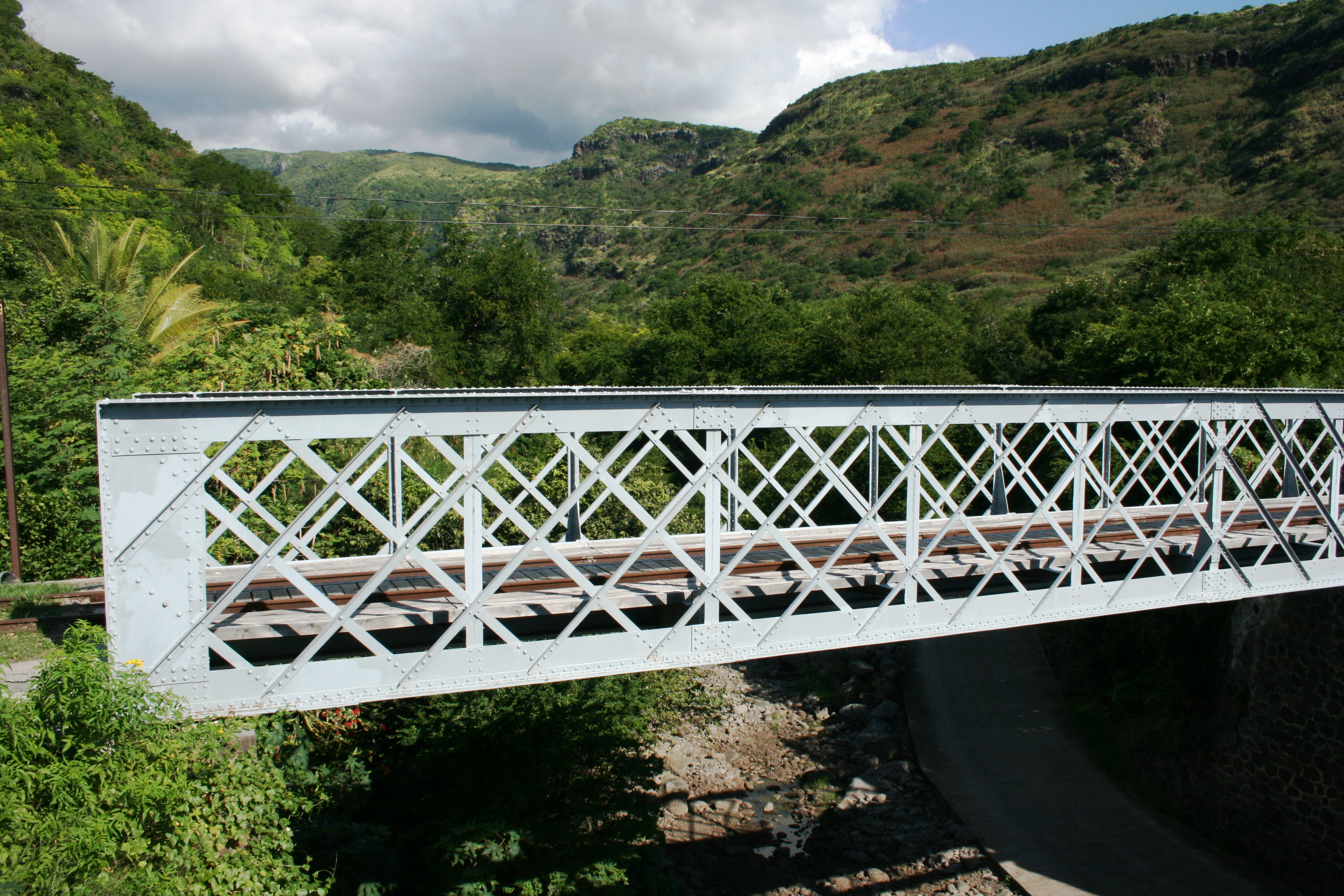
The Ravine de la Grande Chaloupe where it is crossed by the rail bridge

Ravine de la Grande Chaloupe Important Bird Area is an 825 ha tract of land on the island of Réunion, a French territory in the western Indian Ocean.

== Description ==
The IBA lies on the coast at the north-western end of the island, between the capital of Saint-Denis and the commune of La Possession. It encompasses the steep-sided valley that contains the village of La Grande Chaloupe at its mouth, along with the mouth of Ravine à Jacques nearby. Habitats include one of the last remnants of the island's native lowland forest, as well as secondary grassland and thickets of introduced vegetation, with some coastal cliffs and rocky shoreline. About 40% of the site is protected in the Grande Chaloupe Littoral Conservation Area.

=== Birds ===
The site has been identified by BirdLife International as an Important Bird Area (IBA) because it supports populations of Réunion harriers, Mascarene swiftlets, Mascarene paradise flycatchers, Réunion bulbuls, Mascarene white-eyes, Réunion olive white-eyes and Réunion stonechats.
