= La Grande Chaloupe =

Village on the island of Réunion

- Village
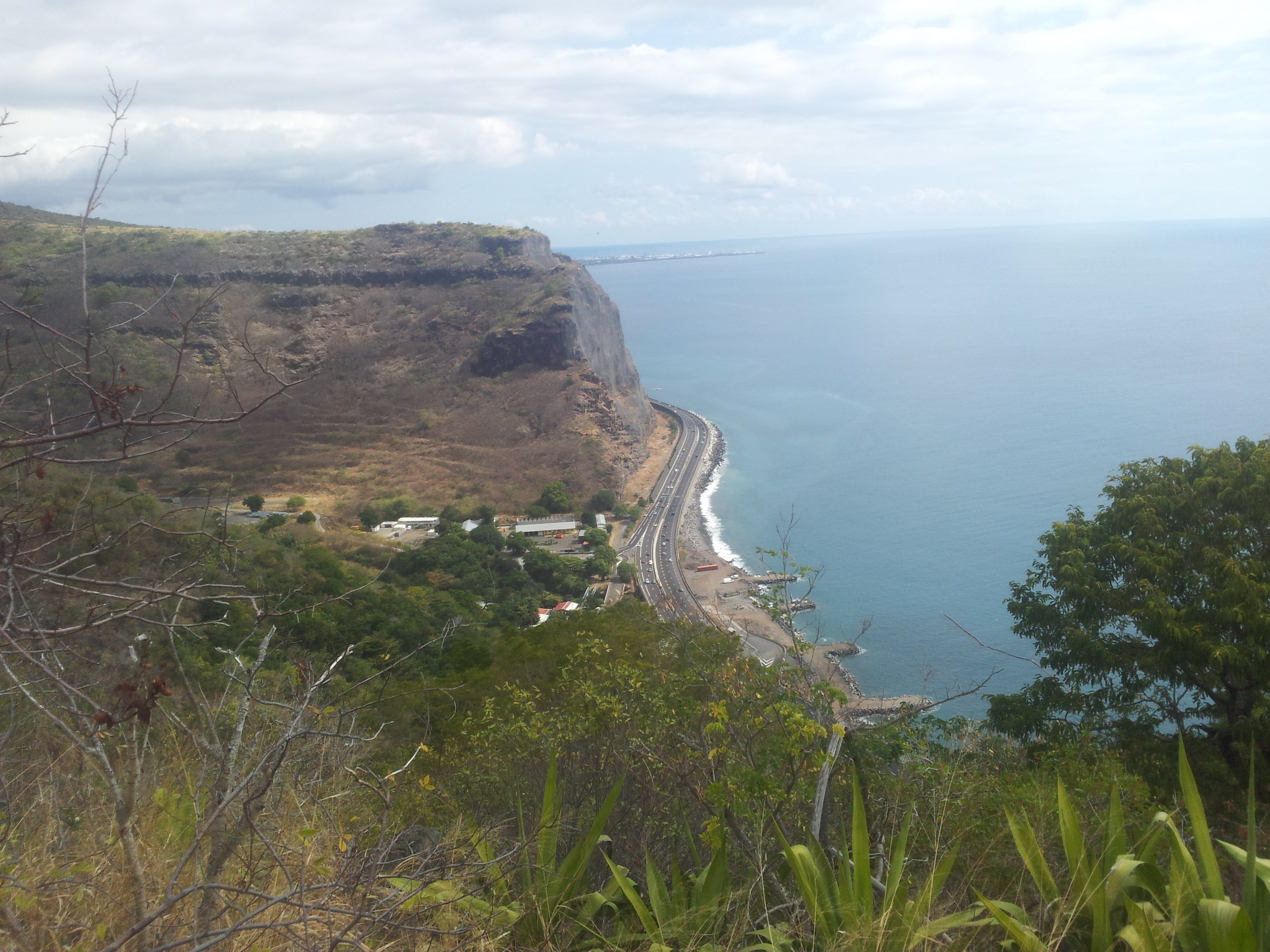
- Coastal road through La Grande Chaloupe

- Location within Réunion
- Coordinates: 20°53′47″S 55°22′37″E
- Country: France
- Department and region: Réunion
- Arrondissement: Saint-Denis
- Time zone: UTC+4:00 (Réunion Time)

La Grande Chaloupe is a village on the island of Réunion, an overseas region of France in the Indian Ocean, located on its northern coast between Saint-Denis and La Possession. It lies within the Ravine de la Grande Chaloupe Important Bird Area.
