= Hôtel de Ville, La Possession =

Town hall in La Possession, Réunion, France

Hôtel de Ville
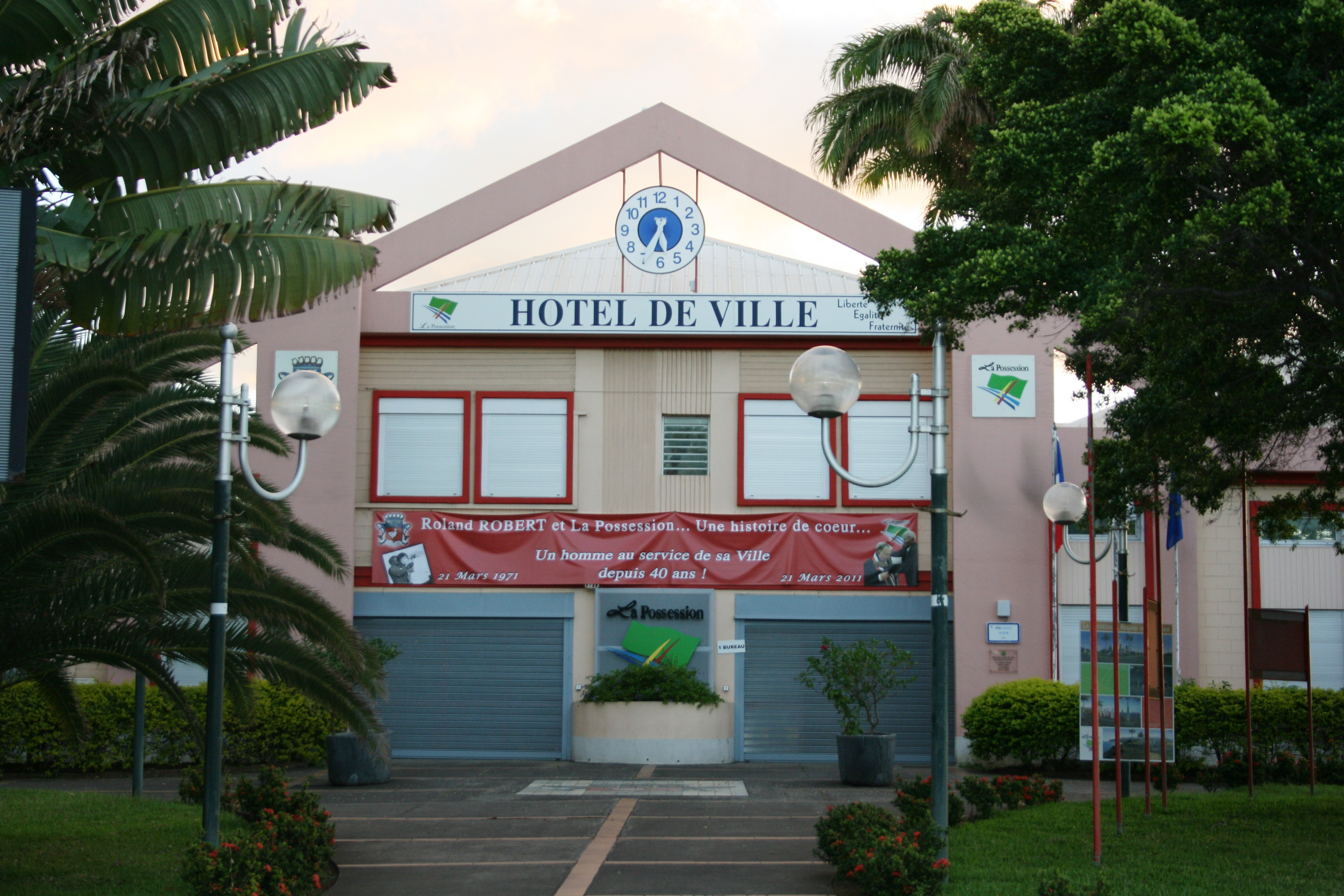
- The main frontage of the Hôtel de Ville in May 2011
- Interactive map of the Hôtel de Ville area

General information
- Type: City hall
- Architectural style: Modern style
- Location: La Possession, Réunion, France
- Coordinates: 20.9265°S 55.3359°E
- Completed: 1967

The Hôtel de Ville (French pronunciation: [otɛl də vil], City Hall) is a municipal building in La Possession, Réunion, in the Indian Ocean, standing on Rue Waldeck Rochet.

== History ==
Early development of the town took place in the early 1830s, on the street leading down to the Grande Ravine des Lataniers, with a chapel completed in 1833 and a temporary and very rudimentary town hall erected there in late 1834. This small municipal building remained adequate for the town until it experienced significant population growth following the construction of the coastal highway connecting La Possession with Saint-Denis between 1956 and 1963.

In the early 1960s, the town council led by the mayor, Morin Dambreville, decided to commission a new town hall. The site they selected was close to the Church of Notre-Dame de l'Assomption on the south side of the new coastal route. The new building was designed in the modern style, built in brick with a cement render finish and was completed in 1967. It was then enlarged in 1975.

The design involved a symmetrical main frontage of eight bays facing north towards Rue Auguste Lacaussade. The central section of two bays featured two glass entrances, separated by a semi-circular plant arrangement, on the ground floor, and four casement windows on the first floor, all surmounted by a timber pediment with a clock in the tympanum. The wings of four bays each were fenestrated by casement windows with moulded surrounds which spanned both floors. Internally, the principal room was the Salle du Conseil (council chamber).

A war memorial in the form of obelisk on a pedestal, which was intended to commemorate the lives of local service personnel who had died in the First World War and had originally been completed in 1929, was relocated from its previous location to the area in front of the new town hall in 1972.

In 2006, the council led by the mayor, Roland Robert, announced a project to create a new town centre in the heart of La Possession. It was confirmed that the project would eventually create 1,850 housing units, accommodating 5,000 residents, as well as a health centre, two schools and a new town hall.
