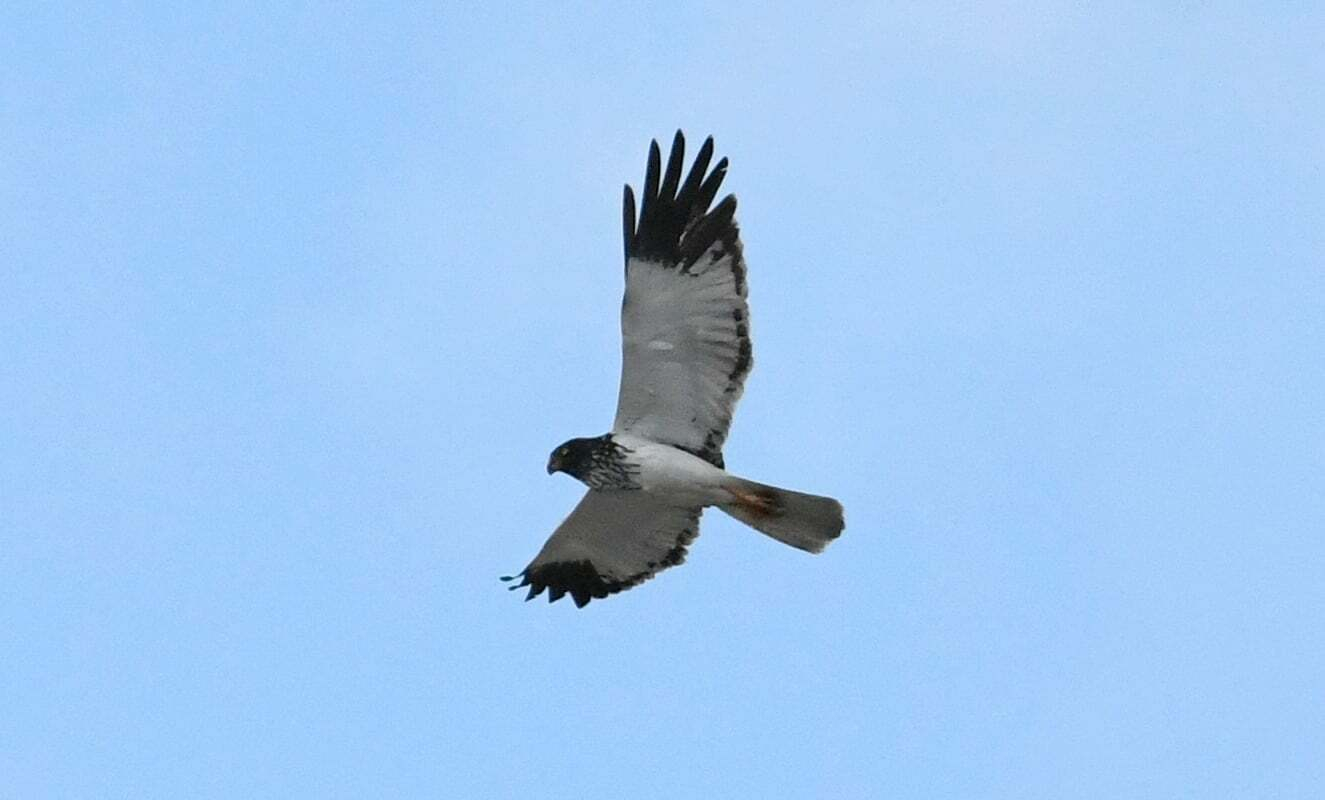
- Bird in flight

Conservation status
- Endangered (IUCN 3.1)

Scientific classification
- Kingdom: Animalia
- Phylum: Chordata
- Class: Aves
- Order: Accipitriformes
- Family: Accipitridae
- Genus: Circus
- Species: C. maillardi

Binomial name
- Circus maillardi J. Verreaux, 1862
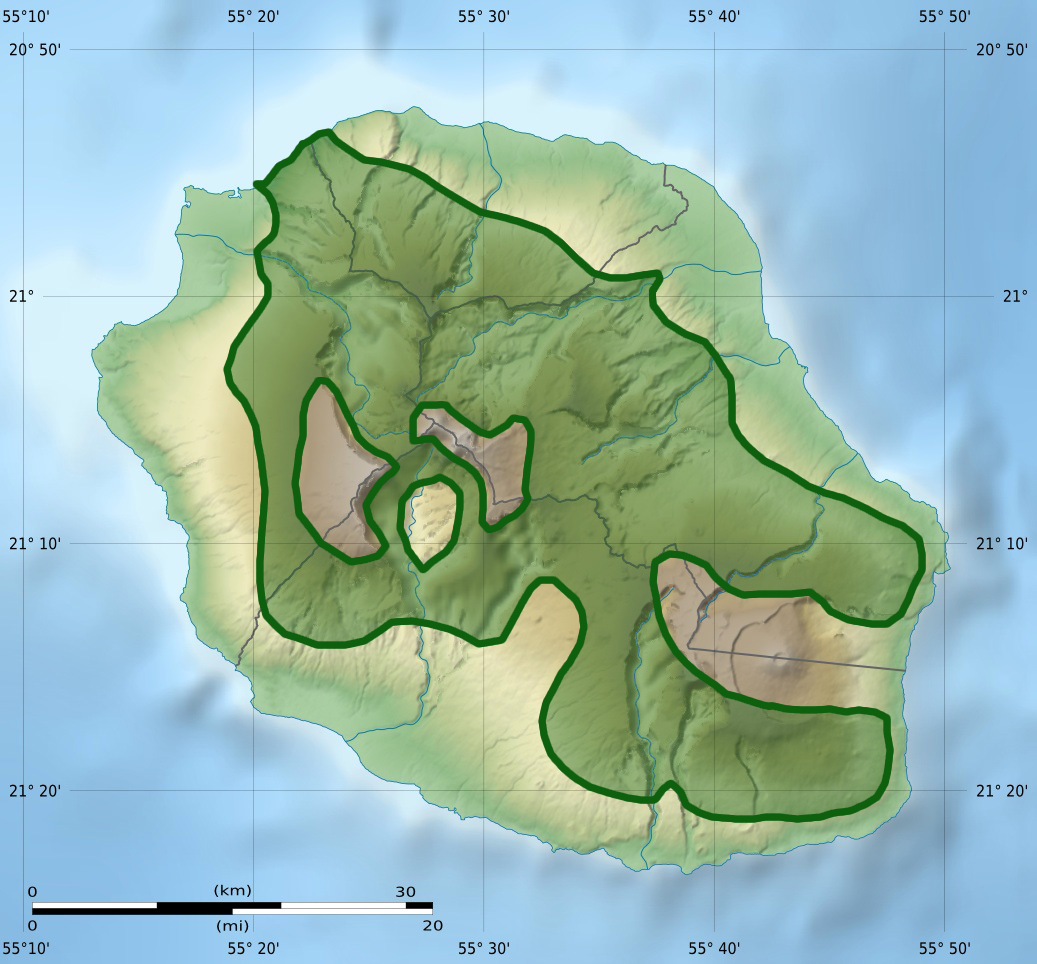

Synonyms
- Astur alphonsi Newton & Gadow, 1893

= Réunion harrier =

Species of bird

The Réunion harrier (Circus maillardi), also known as Réunion marsh harrier, is a species of bird of prey belonging to the marsh harrier group of harriers. It is now found only on the Indian Ocean island of Réunion, although fossil material from Mauritius has been referred to this species. It is known locally as the papangue or pied jaune. The Malagasy harrier (C. macrosceles) of Madagascar and the Comoro Islands was previously treated as a subspecies of this bird but is increasingly regarded as a separate species. The Réunion harrier appears to be declining in numbers and it is classed as an endangered species.

== Taxonomy ==
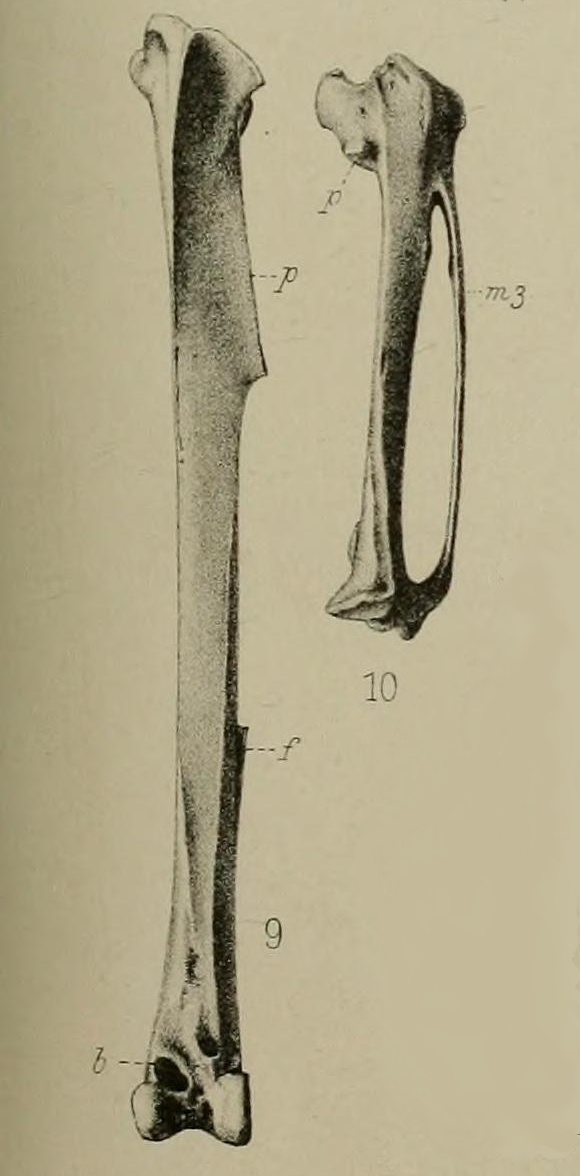
Subfossil remains from Mauritius originally identified as Astur alphonsi in 1893

The species was described in 1862 by Jules Verreaux. He named it in honour of Louis Maillard, a French botanist and engineer who mentioned the bird in a book about the island.

In 1893 Alfred Newton and Hans Gadow described tarsometatarsi, tibiae and metacarpals from a hawk called Astur alphonsi (later renamed Accipiter alphonsi and Circus alphonsi) from Mauritius. In 1958 James Greenway considered this taxon as conspecific with the pied harrier. A later examination of the bones came to the conclusion that Astur alphonsi is actually identical with Circus maillardi, which formerly occurred on Mauritius too but is now extirpated.

In 2015, Graeme Oatley, Robert Simmons and Jerome Fuchs in their complete DNA re-analysis of the 16-member Circus genus, concluded that despite the recent divergence and close genetic similarity of the Madagascar Harrier Circus macrosceles, and Réunion harrierCircus maillardi, their geographic and morphological differences suggests that the species should be elevated to species status. Depending on accepted mutation rates the two species diverged between 300 000 and 100 000 years ago, and Reunion Harriers evolved features enabling capture of birds and bats in the forested habitat.

== Description ==
It is about 42–55 cm long; the female is around 3–15% larger than the male. The male has a blackish head and back with white streaks. The underparts, underwings and rump are white and the tail is grey. The wings are grey and black with a white leading edge. Females and immatures are dark brown with a white rump and barred tail.

The birds are mostly silent except during the breeding season when they give a chattering threat call, a wailing courtship call and chuckling food-associated calls.

The Malagasy harrier is larger and paler with longer wings and legs.

== Ecology and distribution ==
=== Ecology ===
Bird on the ground

The habitat range of the Réunion harrier is very wide, ranging from open or semi-open landscapes, including degraded forests, shrublands, savannah, cultivated field(sugarcane) and pastures, to dense native forests in steep canyons.They rarely live in Acacia forests above 1200 meters, but can reach up to 1600 meters.

This type of bird is more commonly found in native and degraded lowland evergreen forests during the breeding season. It breeds between January and May and lays two or three white eggs in a nest on the ground. Nowadays, its recipe includes many introduced mammals (rats, mice, Tenrecs, etc.), but it used to feed mainly on birds and insects. It has a number of adaptations which are unusual among harriers: broad rounded wings for hunting between trees and a short tarsus and long claws, which are common among those birds of prey which feed on other birds. Although Réunion harrier are morphologically adapted to hunting in the forest, due to changes in recipe, they usually avoid the closed forest canopy, because the above-mentioned mammals are difficult to find in the old environment. In addition, small lizards, frogs and scavengers are also part of their diet.

=== Two clusters of Réunion harriers on the island ===
Due to the volcanic highlands on Réunion Island, Réunion harrier has a genetic barrier between the two ecological regions of Reunion Island. Geographical isolation divides the birds into two separate genetic clusters in the northeast and West. Some surveys have also observed a high degree of philopatry in Réunion harriers. The above points lead to the phenomenon of inbreeding among them, especially in the northeast clusters.

== Status and conservation ==
=== Threats ===
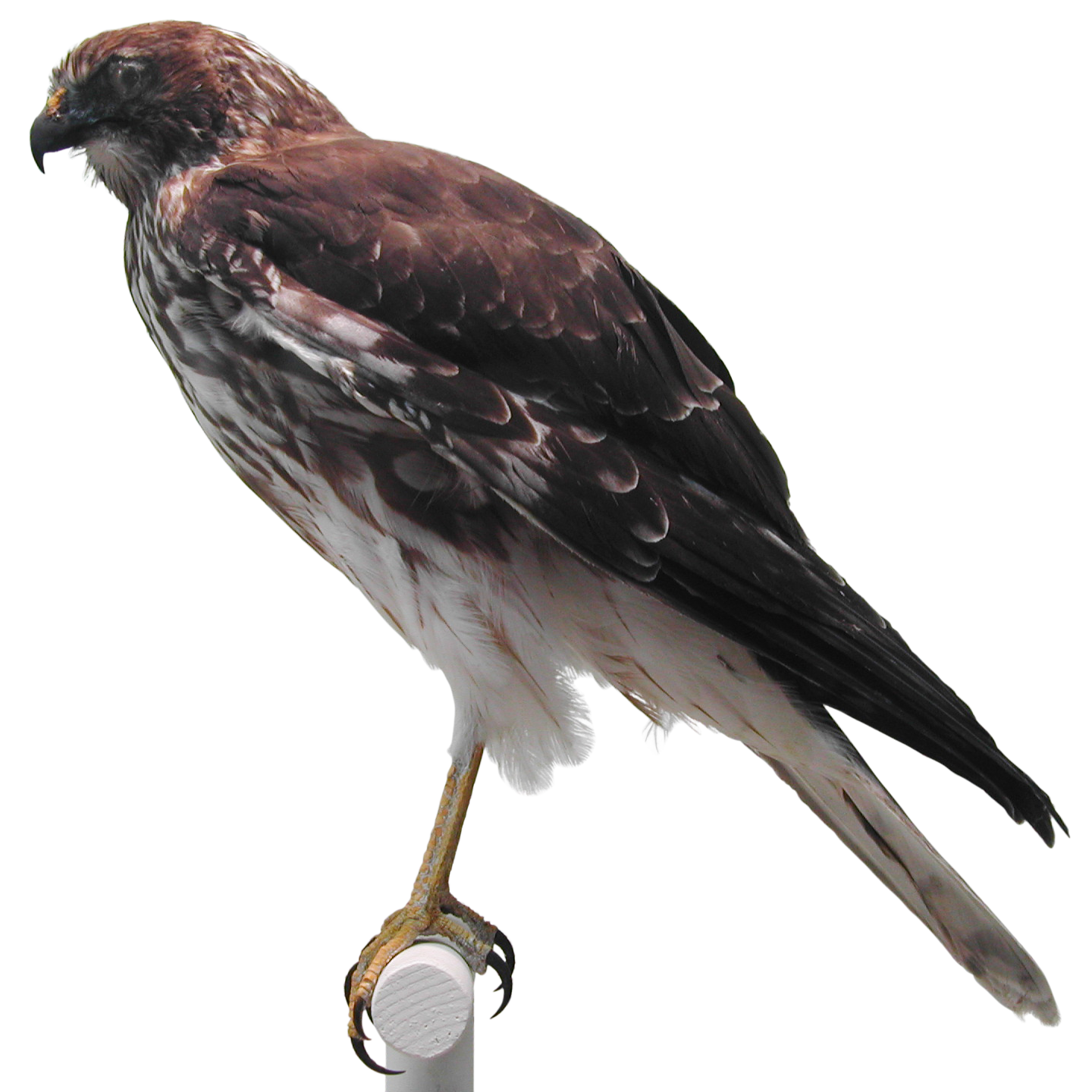
Specimen in Réunion Natural History Museum

Some research in recent years have shown that the biggest threat to the Réunion harrier on the island is rodenticide. Anticoagulant rodenticides (AR) are widely used on Réunion Island to prevent rats and house mice from transmitting leptospirosis transmission to humans and limit their damage to sugarcane crops. These rodents are part of the reason for the decline in the number of endangered species endemic to Réunion Island, and Anticoagulant rodenticides (AR) is the main method to control rodents at present, and helps to eliminate some invasive species, so as to protect the biodiversity of the island. However, rodenticides put rodent predators, such as the Réunion Harrier, at high risk of secondary poisoning.

In the same survey, people measured the concentration of AR in the liver of 58 harriers collected from 1999 to 2016, and 93% of harriers detected ar residue. The number of harriers exposed to AR and the number of individuals who may be poisoned increased with time. Dichlorvos is the most common, while Bromadiolone and bromadiolone have the highest concentrations.

Poaching and persecution (it was considered a predator of chickens and was previously considered an ominous bird), along with rodenticides, pose the most serious threat at present. According to another survey, the mercury (Hg) content in the liver of some Réunion harrier is relatively high, which is positively correlated with the proportion of cities within the falcon habitat.

In addition, the expansion of urbanization and road construction have further disrupted breeding habitats. Below 1300 meters above sea level, farming and urbanization have eliminated all native forests except the steepest mountain slopes, while hurricanes, rainstorm and fires may damage the remaining habitats, and exotic plants are increasingly damaging forests. Other threats include afforestation management of some forests and collisions with cables and wind turbines.

=== The current situation of Réunion harrier ===
According to a 2010 estimate, the number of mature individuals of the Réunion harrier is around 200-560, including approximately 150-200 breeding pairs. Before humans arrived on Réunion Island, about 1000-2000 years ago, the population of Réunion harrier began to decline, followed by a dramatic decline 100 years ago after human settlement. Since the late 1970s, it has been believed that the population of Réunion harriers is at least stable and may increase after protective measures are taken. However, subsequent investigations found that between 2000 and 2010, the population density in some areas slightly decreased due to the expansion of human settlements and activity ranges during this period.

A 2023 survey showed that the survival rate of juvenile and subadults birds of Réunion harrier is 66% per year, while the survival rate of adult birds is only 71%.

This survey suggests that due to the low adult survival rate and declining reproductive rate of the Réunion harrier, even under optimistic estimates, the population of Réunion harrier is at high risk of near extinction in the next 40 years unless the survival rate and hatching success rate of adult birds significantly increase, or 10% -20% of imported females are introduced annually.

There is currently a significant phenomenon of inbreeding among the Réunion harrier, especially in the Northeast cluster species, where a considerable portion of the samples have first or second degree kinship relationships. During the process of inbreeding, although some of the most severe harmful mutations are eliminated, a large number of moderate effect harmful mutations accumulate in the population, which may pose a threat to the genetic health and adaptive potential of the population. There is evidence to suggest that the Réunion harrier is experiencing inbreeding depression, and an increase in hatching failure rate is a common manifestation of inbreeding depression in captive and wild bird populations.

=== Protection of Réunion harrier ===
Due to its small population size and extremely limited distribution range, the Réunion harrier has been listed as an endangered species by BirdLife International since 2000. There are some possible protective measures. One of them is to restrict and rationalize the outdoor use of rodenticides, such as prioritizing evidence-based bait deployment over preventive use.

Another possible protection strategy is to transfer some individuals or eggs of the Réunion harrier from the western cluster to the northeastern cluster where inbreeding is more prevalent, in order to reduce the problem of inbreeding among the island's Harriers.

Sites identified by BirdLife International as being important for the conservation of the species are the Important Bird Areas (IBAs) of:

- Mouth of the Cirque de Salazie
- Ravine de la Grande Chaloupe
- Rivière des Marsouins – Grand Étang
- Rivière des Remparts - Rivière Langevin

== Sources ==
- Ferguson-Lees, James; Christie, David A. (2001). Raptors of the World. Christopher Helm. ISBN 978-0-7136-8026-3.
- Barré, Nicolas; Barau, Armand; Jouanin, Christian (2005). Oiseaux de la Réunion (in French). Orphie. ISBN 978-2-87763-263-8.
- Clarke, Roger (1995). The Marsh Harrier. Hamlyn. ISBN 978-0-600-58301-1.
- Greenway, James Cowan (1967). Extinct and Vanishing Birds of the World. Dover Publications. ISBN 978-0-486-21869-4.
- Rothschild, Lionel Walter Rothschild (1907). Extinct birds. doi:10.5962/bhl.title.77436. OCLC 6755149.
