= Mafate =

Caldera in Réunion, France

Coordinates: 21°3′14″S 55°25′14″E

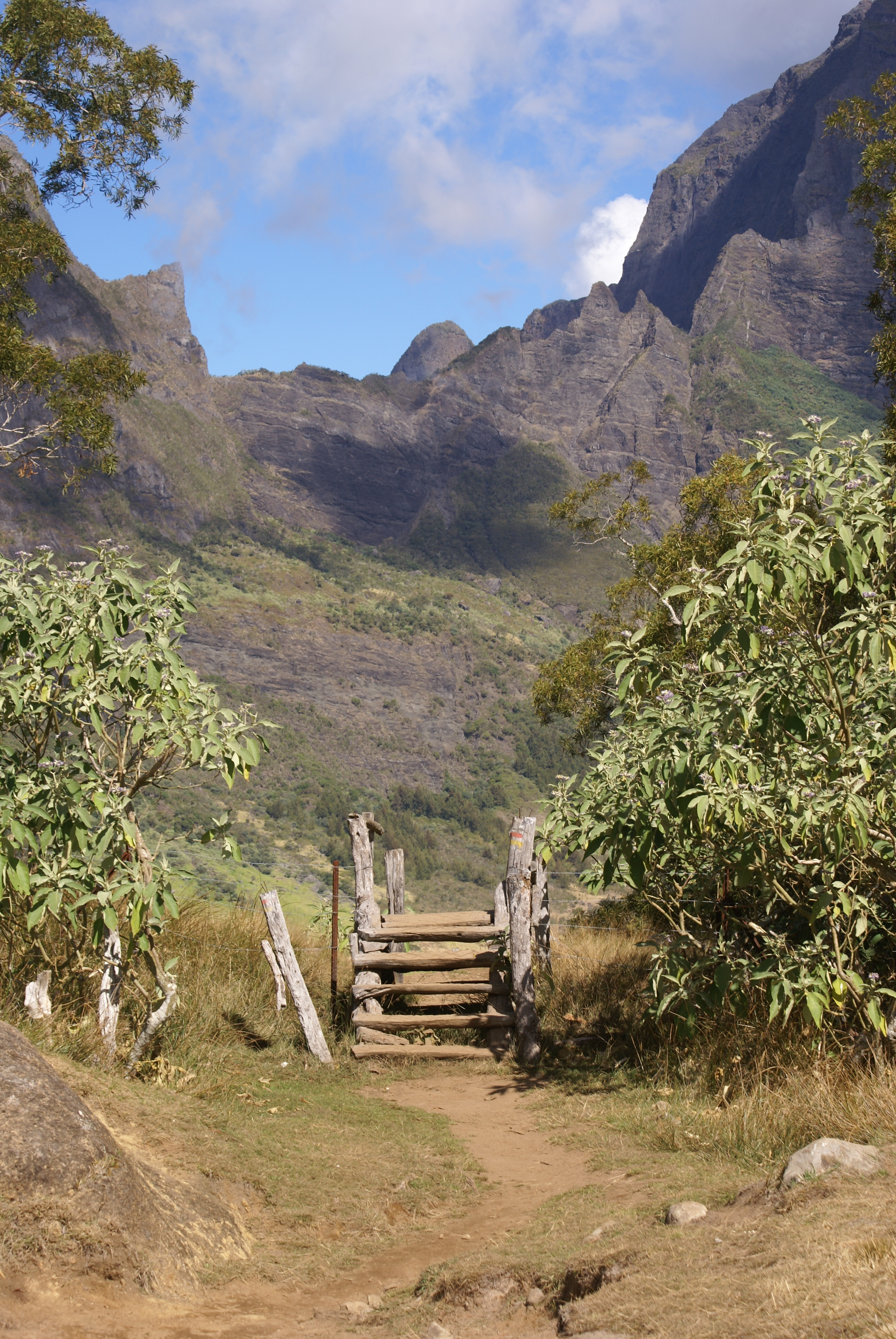
Stile on the path between Marla and Plaine des Tamarins

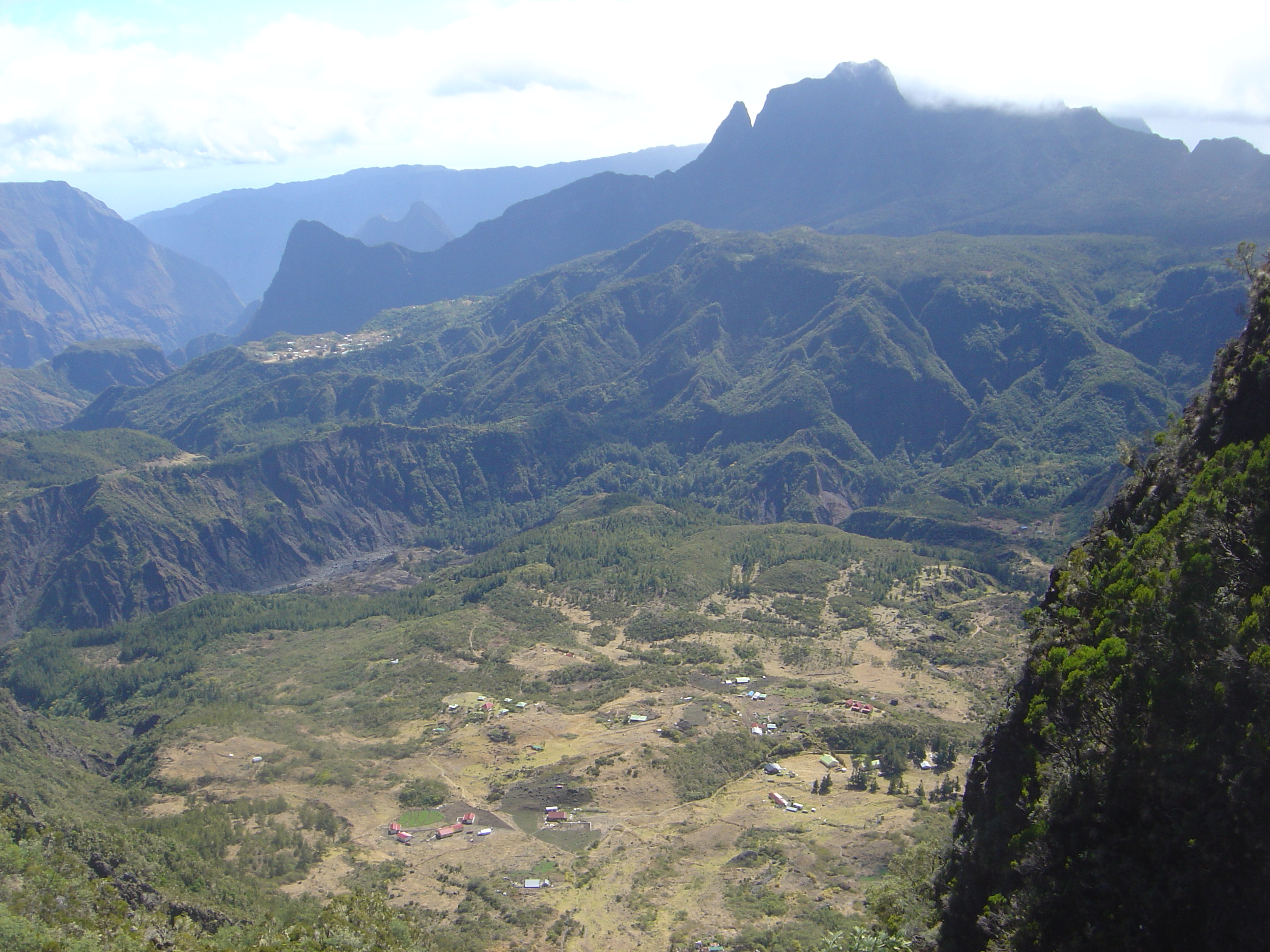
Marla, seen from the Col du Taïbit

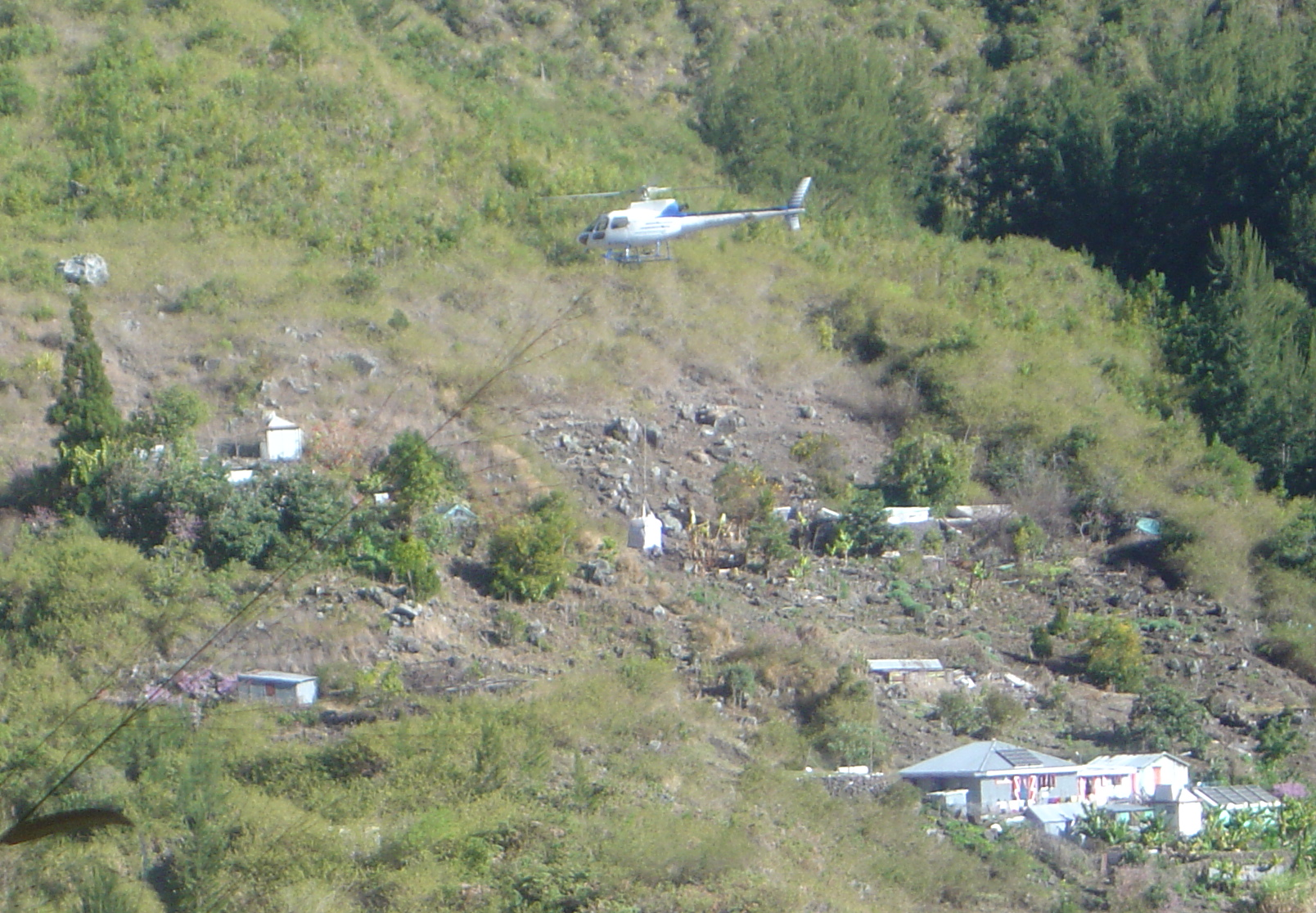
Airlift over Roche-Plate

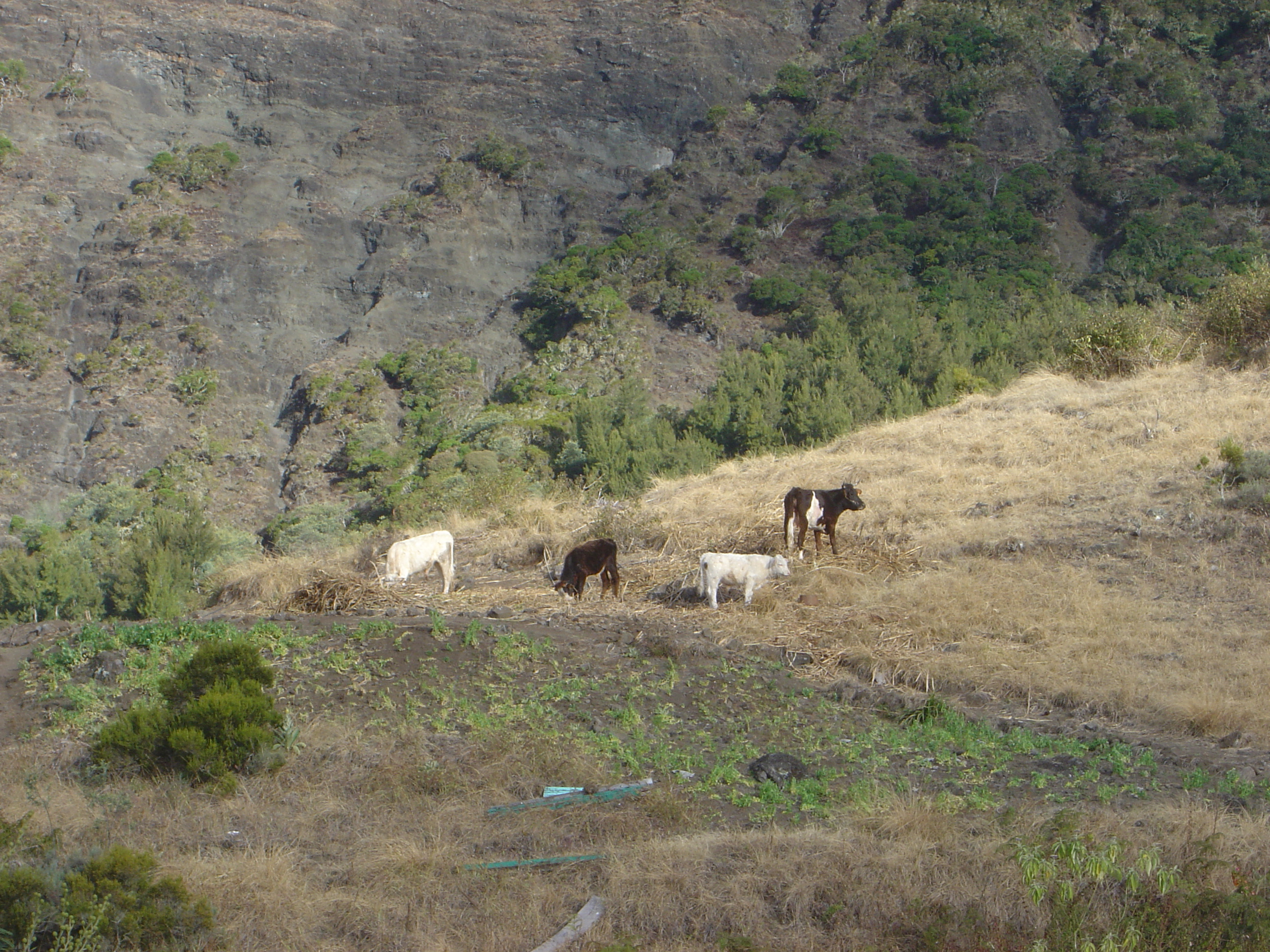
Locals often have a few crops, such as lentils, and a few heads of cattle

The Cirque de Mafate is a caldera on Réunion. It was formed from the collapse of the large shield volcano the Piton des Neiges.

The very remote and inaccessible cirque was settled in the 19th century by maroon slaves (i.e. slaves who had escaped from their masters), then later by poor white laborers. It owes its name to one maroon leader.

== Geography ==
The cirque is entirely enclosed by mountains, especially tall cliffs, known as remparts, save for the sole river exiting, the Rivière des Galets ("river of the pebbles"). Inside the cirque, there are considerable declivities. The îlets are pieces of more-or-less flat lands, on which the hamlets are located.

The name "Mafate" comes from the Malagasy word "Mahafaty", which means lethal, an allusion to the difficulty of reaching the Cirque.

== Population ==
The cirque has one village, La Nouvelle, and several hamlets (fr. îlet): Marla, Roche-Plate, the Îlet-aux-Orangers, Grand Place etc.

The Cirque is entirely public property, managed by the Forestry service, from which the inhabitants rent inexpensive concessions.

There is no main electrical supply. Inhabitants thus produce their own electricity using solar panels (with battery storage), and occasionally diesel generators. However, fuel for the latter must be brought by helicopter at high cost. Because of the reduced available power supply, inhabitants systematically use low-consumption (fluorescent) light bulbs.

Similarly, all inhabitants use solar water heaters. These can be supplemented by gas-powered heaters — but gas canisters must also be brought by helicopter.

== Services ==
La Nouvelle and hamlets have grocery stores where staples can be bought. Typically, these stores also provide some limited bar and restaurant services (hot coffee and local fast food, such as samosas).

Many inhabitants have opened gîtes (dormitories, WC and showers) where hikers can stay for the night, and often dine, for a fee.

La Nouvelle and several of the hamlets have elementary schools. In 2005, the school at Marla reopened with 6 pupils after being closed for insufficient enrollment. There are neither secondary nor higher education facilities.

There are several dispensaries between which a few nurses rotate, as well as scheduled visits of a physician, but no permanent health care facilities. All emergencies have to be evacuated by helicopter. There is no Gendarmerie station.

== Transportation ==
One peculiarity of Mafate is that there are no roads. Because of this, it is a major attraction for hikers willing to experience some unspoiled nature, while still benefiting from grocery stores and other amenities. For this reason, with the impending creation of a national park on the heights of Réunion, it seems very unlikely that roads will ever be built.

All access, including for supplies, is by foot or helicopter. There are a number of footpaths for reaching the cirque, among which:

- By the Col des Bœufs ("pass of the oxen"), from the Cirque de Salazie, leading to La Nouvelle. This way is the easiest, since there is a forestry road leading to parking lots at the pass.
- By the Col du Taïbit from the Cirque de Cilaos.
- By the Canalisation des Orangers on the heights of Saint Paul (Réunion).
