= Rivière des Galets (Réunion) =

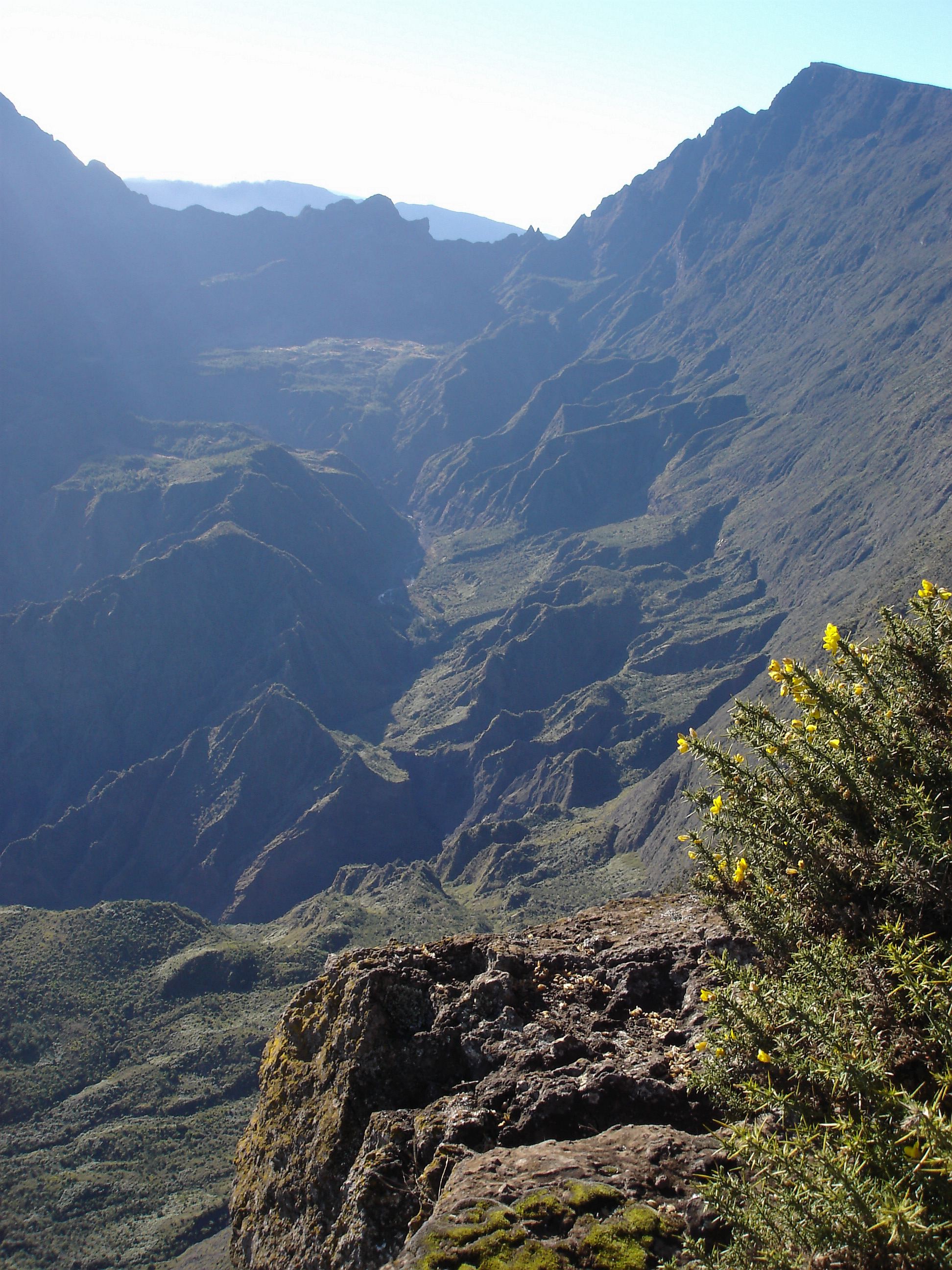

Location
- Country: France
- Region: Réunion

Physical characteristics
- Mouth: Indian Ocean
  - coordinates: 20°57′15″S 55°16′41″E
- Length: 36.2 km (22.5 mi)

The Rivière des Galets is a river on the Indian Ocean island of Réunion. It rises on the western slopes of Le Gros Morne, flowing northwest to reach the sea at Le Port after 36.2 km.
