= Piton des Neiges =

Shield volcano in northwest Réunion, Indian Ocean

- Snow Peak
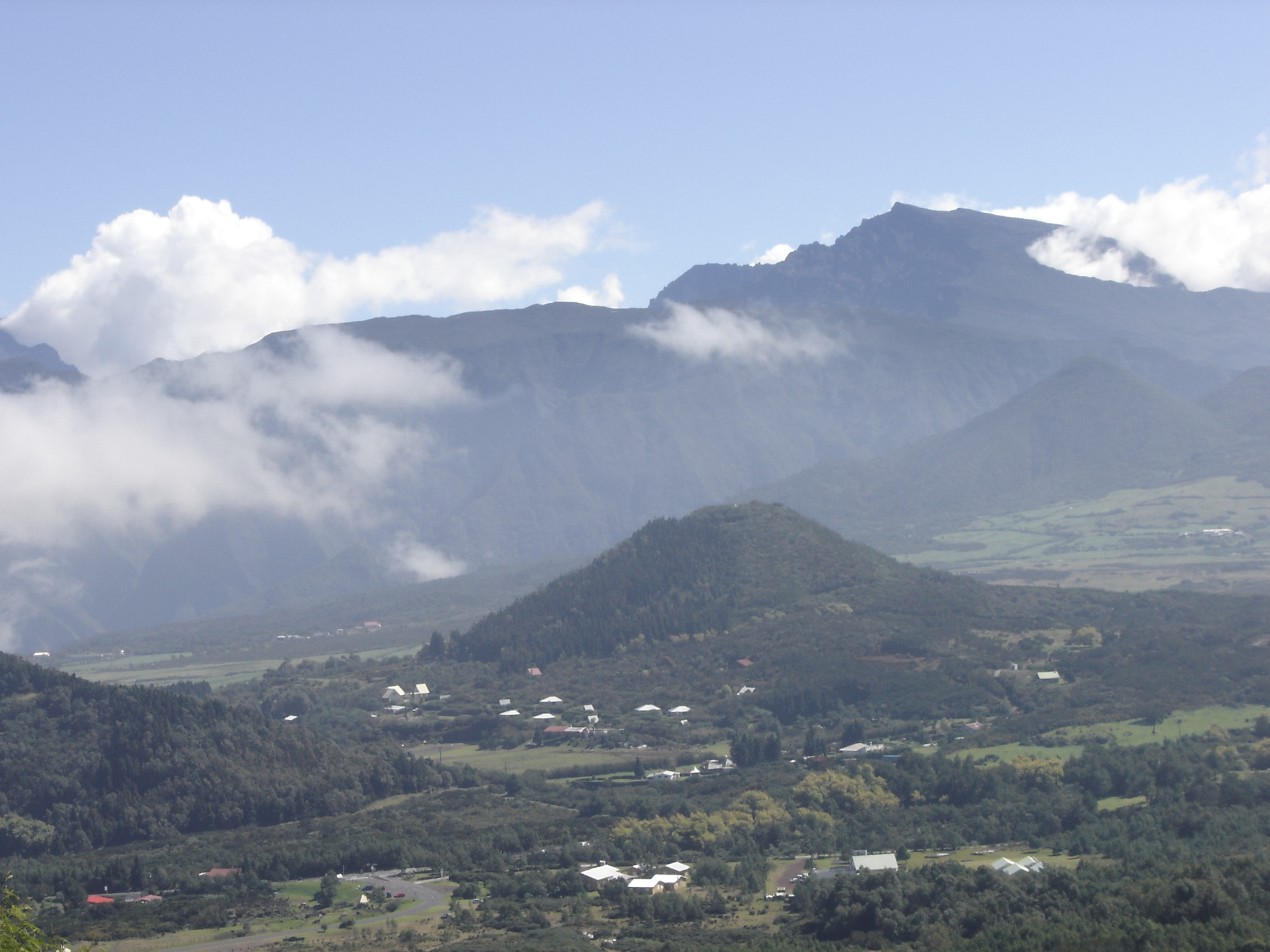
- Piton des Neiges

Highest point
- Elevation: 3,070 m (10,070 ft)
- Prominence: 3,070 m (10,070 ft); Ranked 82nd
- Listing: Island high point 17th Ultra; World's most isolated peaks 14th
- Coordinates: 21°05′54″S 55°28′51″E

Naming
- English translation: Snow Peak
- Language of name: French

Geography
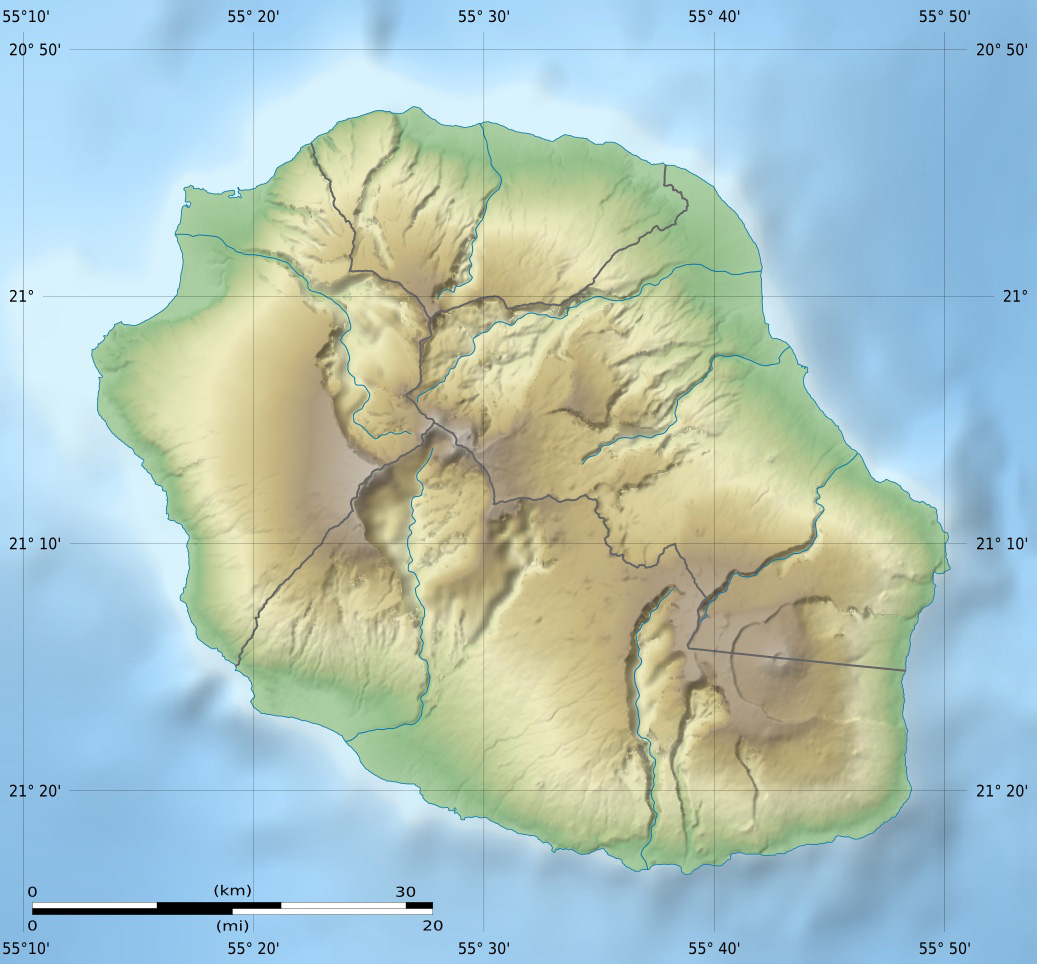
- Location within Réunion
- Location: Réunion, Indian Ocean

Geology
- Rock age: Pliocene
- Mountain type: Complex volcano
- Last eruption: 20,000 years ago

The Piton des Neiges (Snow Peak) is a 3,069 m (10,069 ft) complex volcano on Réunion, one of the French volcanic islands in the Mascarene Archipelago in the southwestern Indian Ocean. It is located about 800 kilometres (500 mi) east of Madagascar. Piton des Neiges is the highest point on Réunion and considered to be the highest point in the Indian Ocean. Piton des Neiges is ranked 82nd by prominence.

== History and geology ==
Piton des Neiges was formed by the Réunion hotspot and emerged from the sea about two million years ago. The volcano has been inactive for 20,000 years. Réunion itself is considered to be about three million years old; the other two islands in the archipelago, Mauritius and Rodrigues, are 7.8 million and 1.5 million years old, respectively.

The Piton des Neiges forms the northwestern two-thirds of Réunion, with the very active Piton de la Fournaise comprising the rest. Additionally, it is surrounded by three massive crater valleys. As its name suggests, snow is occasionally seen on its summit in winter. Piton des Neiges is ranked 14th in the world by topographic isolation.

The island possesses a high endemism of flowering plants (about 225); this has justified the creation of a biological reserve on the lower slopes of the Piton des Neiges.

A panoramic view near to the Gîte de la Caverne Dufour.

== Hiking ==
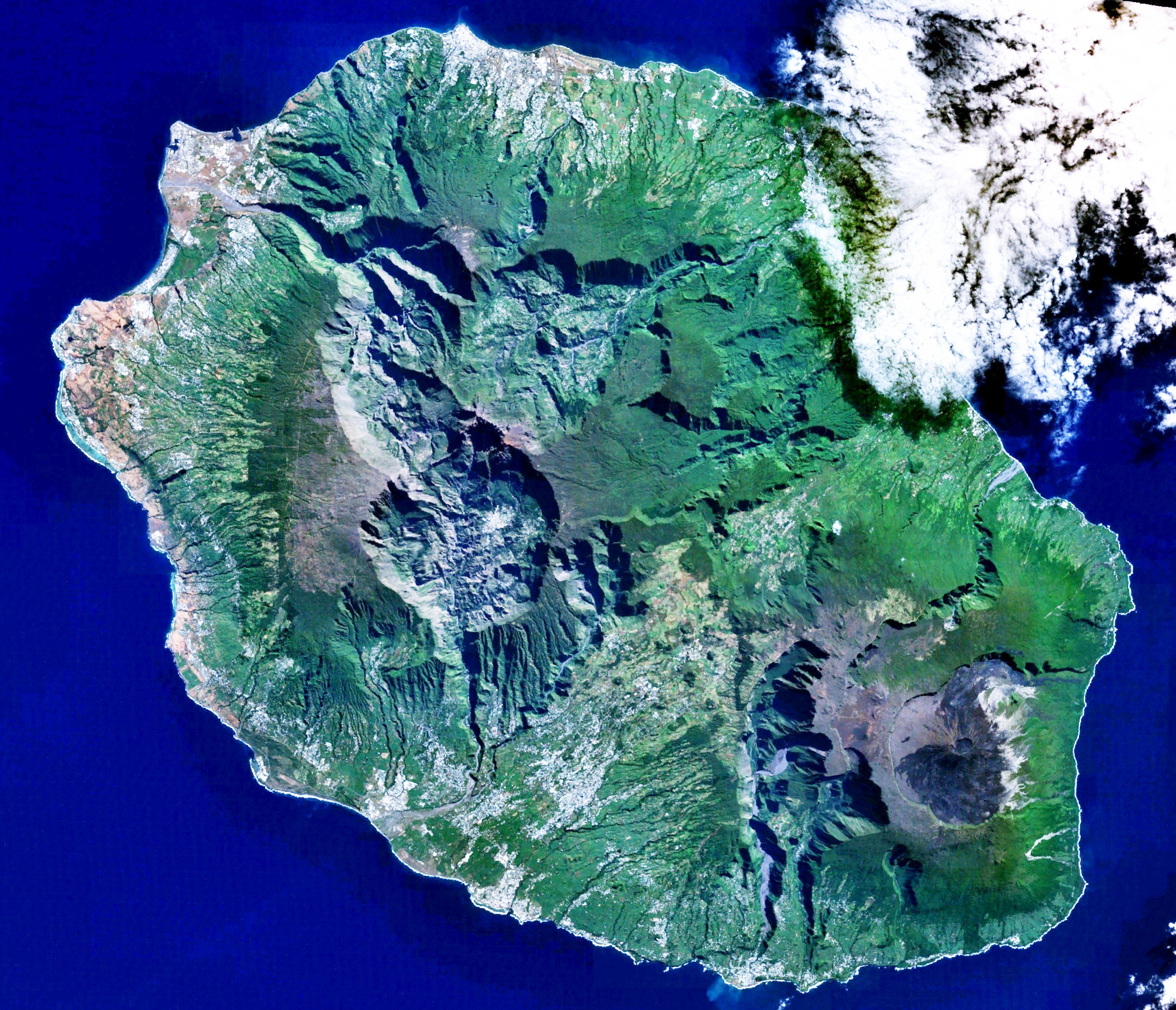
The island of Reunion with the three central Cirques, with the ridge summit of the Piton des Neiges in the northwest centre (lighter brown area). The white spot on the crater edge to the southeast of the summit is the alpine hut.

Three tracks lead up to the peak: one from the Cirque de Salazie, another from the Cirque de Cilaos, and the third from Plaine des Cafres. They meet at a staffed mountain hut about an hour's walk below the peak.

The hike starting from Cilaos spans 8.9 miles, typically taking an average of 8.5 hours to complete. Although this is feasible in a single day, most hikers prefer to stay overnight at the mountain hut, Gîte de la Caverne Dufour. This hike is considered challenging due to the 1,736 metres (5,696 ft) elevation gain.

The hike starting from la Plaine des Cafres is much longer, at 19.6 miles, and a similar elevation gain of 4,691 feet (1,430 m).

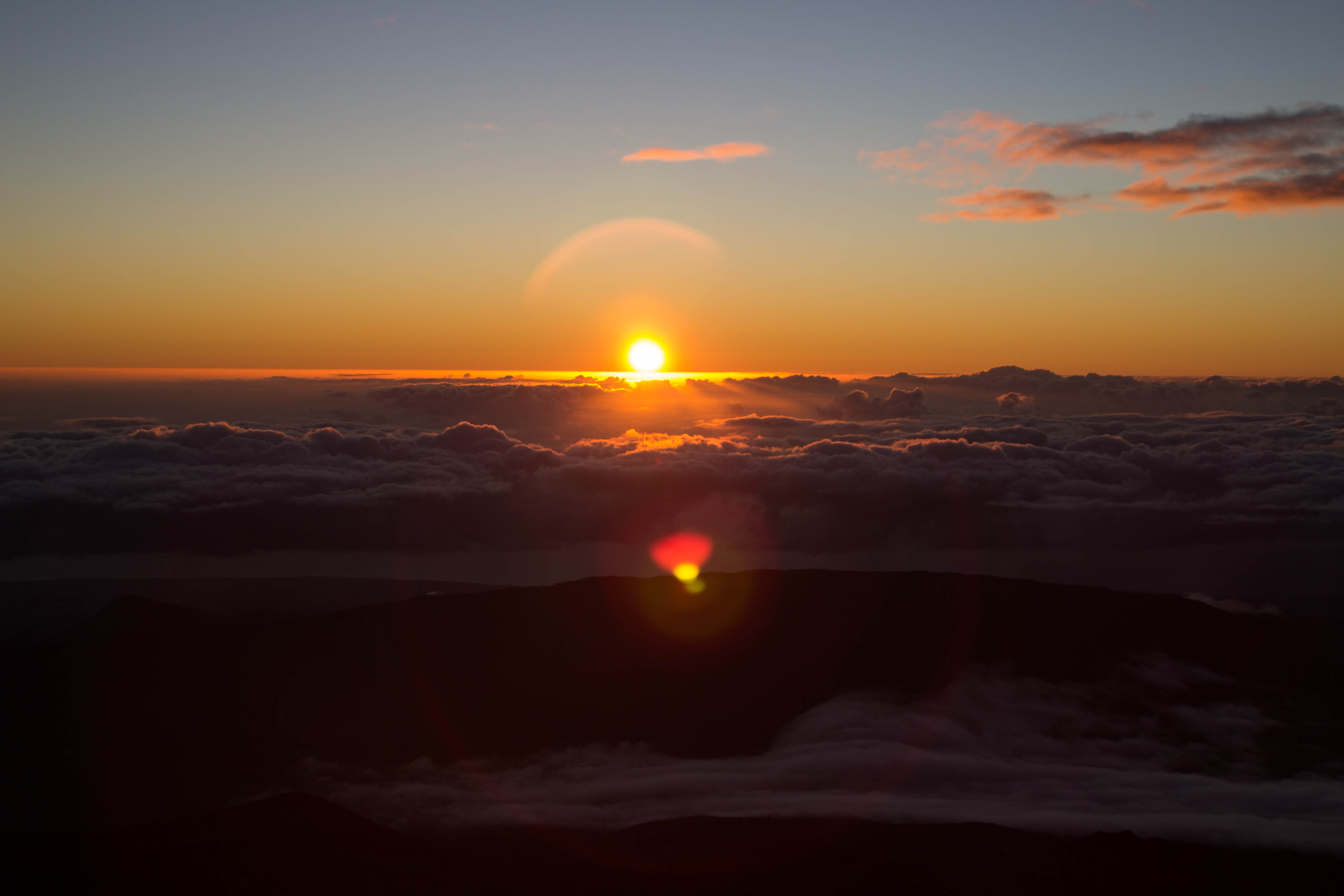
Sunrise from the top of Piton des Neiges.

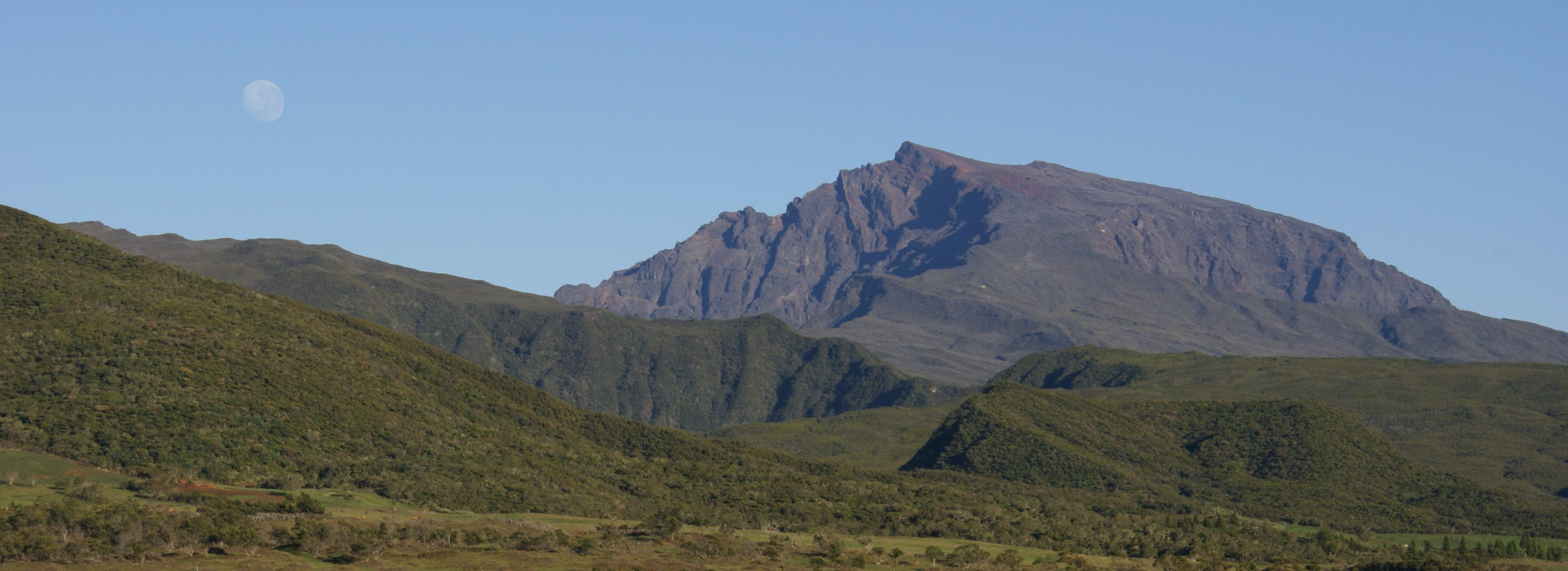
Piton des Neiges at early morning seen from South-East

== See also ==
- List of volcanoes in Réunion
- List of islands by highest point
- List of Ultras of Africa
- Piton des Neiges – Gros Morne Important Bird Area
