= Petite-Île =

Commune in Réunion, France

- Commune
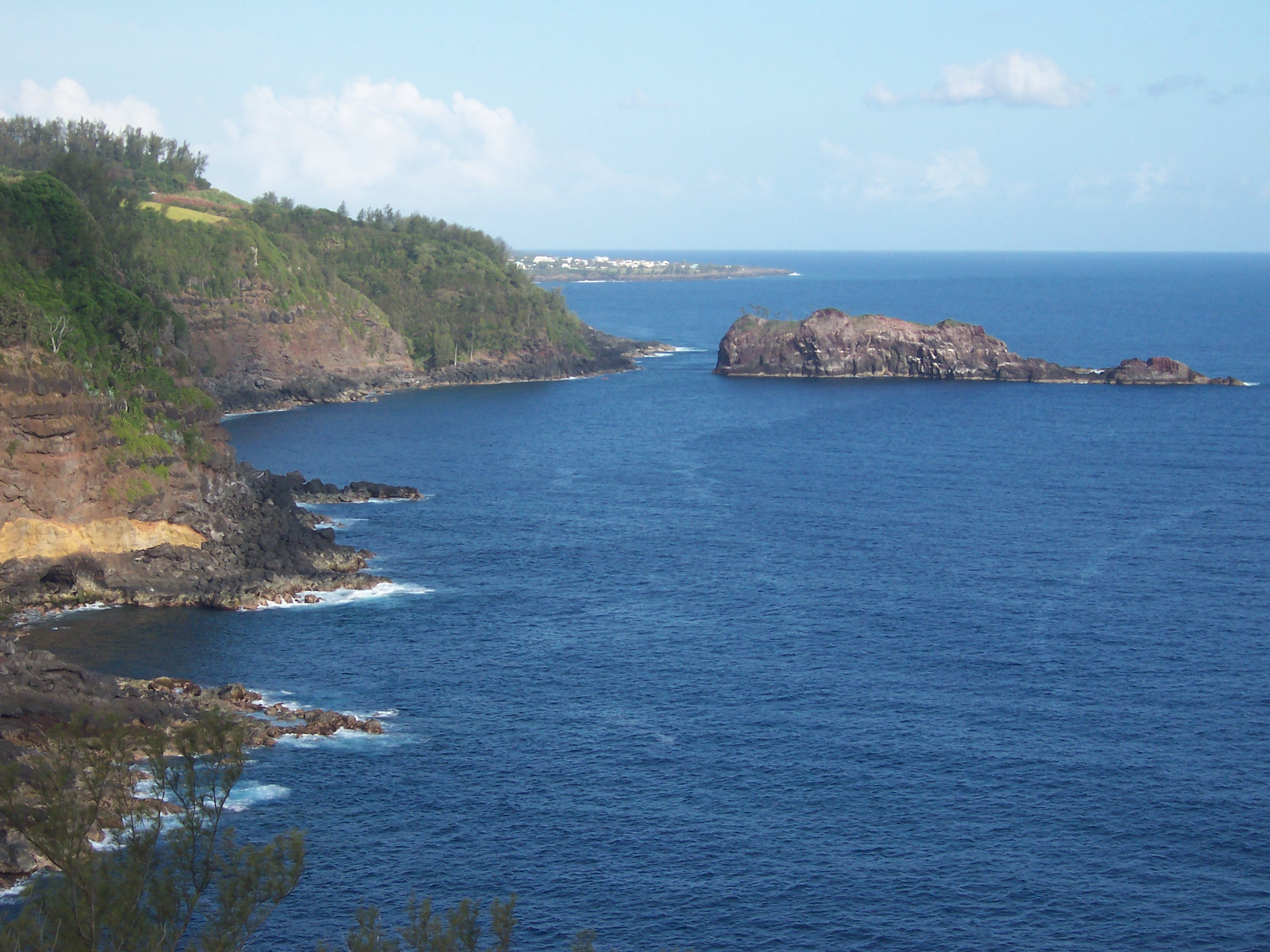
- The coastline of Petite-Île

- Coat of arms

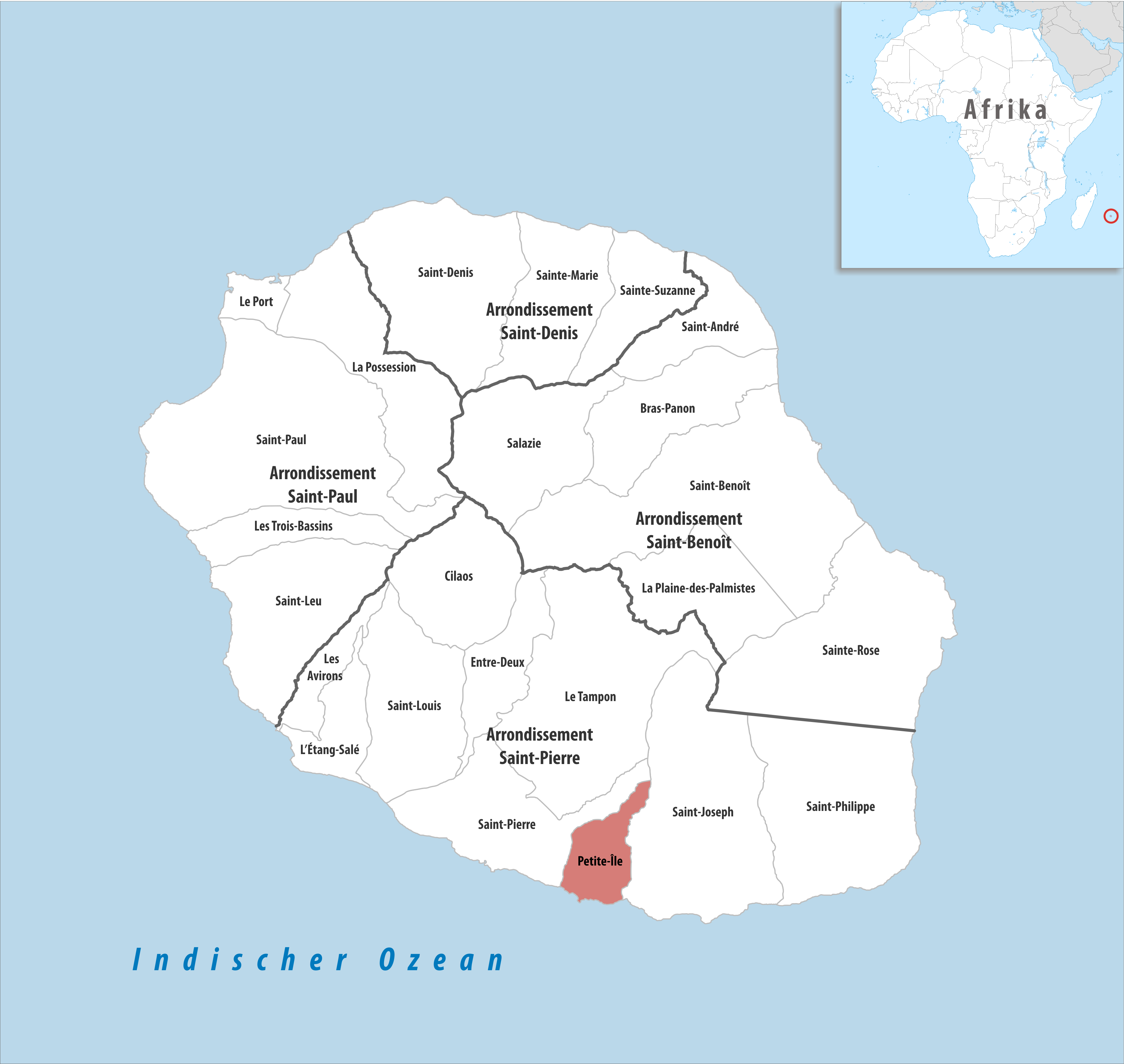
- Location of Petite-Île
- Coordinates: 21°21′21″S 55°33′57″E
- Country: France
- Overseas region and department: Réunion
- Arrondissement: Saint-Pierre
- Canton: Saint-Pierre-3
- Intercommunality: Villes solidaires

Government
  - Mayor (2020–2026): Serge Hoareau
- Area^{1}: 33.93 km^{2} (13.10 sq mi)
- Elevation: 307 m (1,007 ft)
- Highest elevation: 1,581 m (5,187 ft)
- Lowest elevation: 0 m (0 ft)
- Population (2023): 13,067
  - Density: 385.1/km^{2} (997.4/sq mi)
- Time zone: UTC+04:00
- INSEE/Postal code: 97405 /97429
- ^{1} French Land Register data, which excludes lakes, ponds, glaciers > 1 km^{2} (0.386 sq mi or 247 acres) and river estuaries.

Petite-Île (French pronunciation: [pətit il], literally Little Isle) is a commune on the French island and department of Réunion. The commune is bordered by the communes of Saint-Joseph to the east and Saint-Pierre to the west. The commune gets its name from the uninhabited islet off of its coast, the only such islet near Réunion that has vegetation. The commune was established in 1935.

== Geography ==
=== Climate ===
Petite-Île has a tropical monsoon climate (Köppen climate classification Am). The average annual temperature in Petite-Île is 24.3 °C (75.7 °F). The average annual rainfall is 1,458.6 mm (57.43 in) with February as the wettest month. The temperatures are highest on average in January, at around 27.4 °C (81.3 °F), and lowest in July, at around 21.0 °C (69.8 °F). The highest temperature ever recorded in Petite-Île was 36.6 °C (97.9 °F) on 21 January 2009; the coldest temperature ever recorded was −5.9 °C (21.4 °F) on 2 August 2001.

Climate data for Petite-Île (1991–2020 averages, extremes 2000−present)
Month	Jan	Feb	Mar	Apr	May	Jun	Jul	Aug	Sep	Oct	Nov	Dec	Year
Record high °C (°F)	36.6 (97.9)	36.0 (96.8)	35.4 (95.7)	34.5 (94.1)	33.1 (91.6)	30.7 (87.3)	31.7 (89.1)	29.5 (85.1)	30.7 (87.3)	31.8 (89.2)	33.4 (92.1)	35.6 (96.1)	36.6 (97.9)
Mean daily maximum °C (°F)	31.5 (88.7)	31.3 (88.3)	30.7 (87.3)	29.3 (84.7)	27.4 (81.3)	25.3 (77.5)	24.4 (75.9)	24.7 (76.5)	25.7 (78.3)	27.4 (81.3)	29.2 (84.6)	30.9 (87.6)	28.1 (82.6)
Daily mean °C (°F)	27.4 (81.3)	27.3 (81.1)	26.9 (80.4)	25.6 (78.1)	23.9 (75.0)	22.0 (71.6)	21.0 (69.8)	21.1 (70.0)	21.9 (71.4)	23.3 (73.9)	24.9 (76.8)	26.6 (79.9)	24.3 (75.7)
Mean daily minimum °C (°F)	23.3 (73.9)	23.4 (74.1)	23.0 (73.4)	21.9 (71.4)	20.3 (68.5)	18.6 (65.5)	17.7 (63.9)	17.6 (63.7)	18.0 (64.4)	19.2 (66.6)	20.6 (69.1)	22.4 (72.3)	20.5 (68.9)
Record low °C (°F)	19.7 (67.5)	19.9 (67.8)	19.7 (67.5)	18.6 (65.5)	16.0 (60.8)	14.6 (58.3)	15.1 (59.2)	13.6 (56.5)	14.7 (58.5)	14.9 (58.8)	16.5 (61.7)	19.0 (66.2)	13.6 (56.5)
Average precipitation mm (inches)	163.7 (6.44)	187.2 (7.37)	197.4 (7.77)	182.0 (7.17)	138.2 (5.44)	118.3 (4.66)	135.3 (5.33)	72.3 (2.85)	64.7 (2.55)	51.0 (2.01)	57.8 (2.28)	90.7 (3.57)	1,458.6 (57.43)
Average precipitation days (≥ 1.0 mm)	9.5	11.6	12.2	10.9	11.2	12.7	13.3	9.3	6.5	5.6	4.5	6.2	113.4
Source: Météo France

== Population ==
Historical population
Year	Pop.	±% p.a.
1967	7,951	—
1974	7,961	+0.02%
1982	7,834	−0.20%
1990	8,852	+1.54%
1999	10,151	+1.53%
2007	11,672	+1.76%
2012	11,564	−0.19%
2017	12,162	+1.01%
2023	13,067	+1.20%
Source: INSEE

== Economy ==
The main economy in the commune is agriculture-based, with cane sugar plantations, along with fruit and vegetable farming.

== See also ==
- Communes of the Réunion department
