= Mineral industry of Réunion =

Production of mineral commodities represents only a small part of the economy of Réunion, although little quantitative information is available. As of 2006, aggregates, cement, and seacoast coral continued to meet local construction needs. Réunion is not a globally significant mineral producer or consumer.

The privately owned Holcim (Réunion) S.A. is the most significant producer of mineral products in Réunion. In 2006, the company produced an estimated 400,000 t of cement by grinding imported clinker. The company also produced 1.3 million metric tons of aggregates from plants at Bras Panon and Saint-Joseph.
