= Hôtel de Ville, Saint-Joseph, Réunion =

Town hall in Saint-Joseph, Réunion, France

Hôtel de Ville
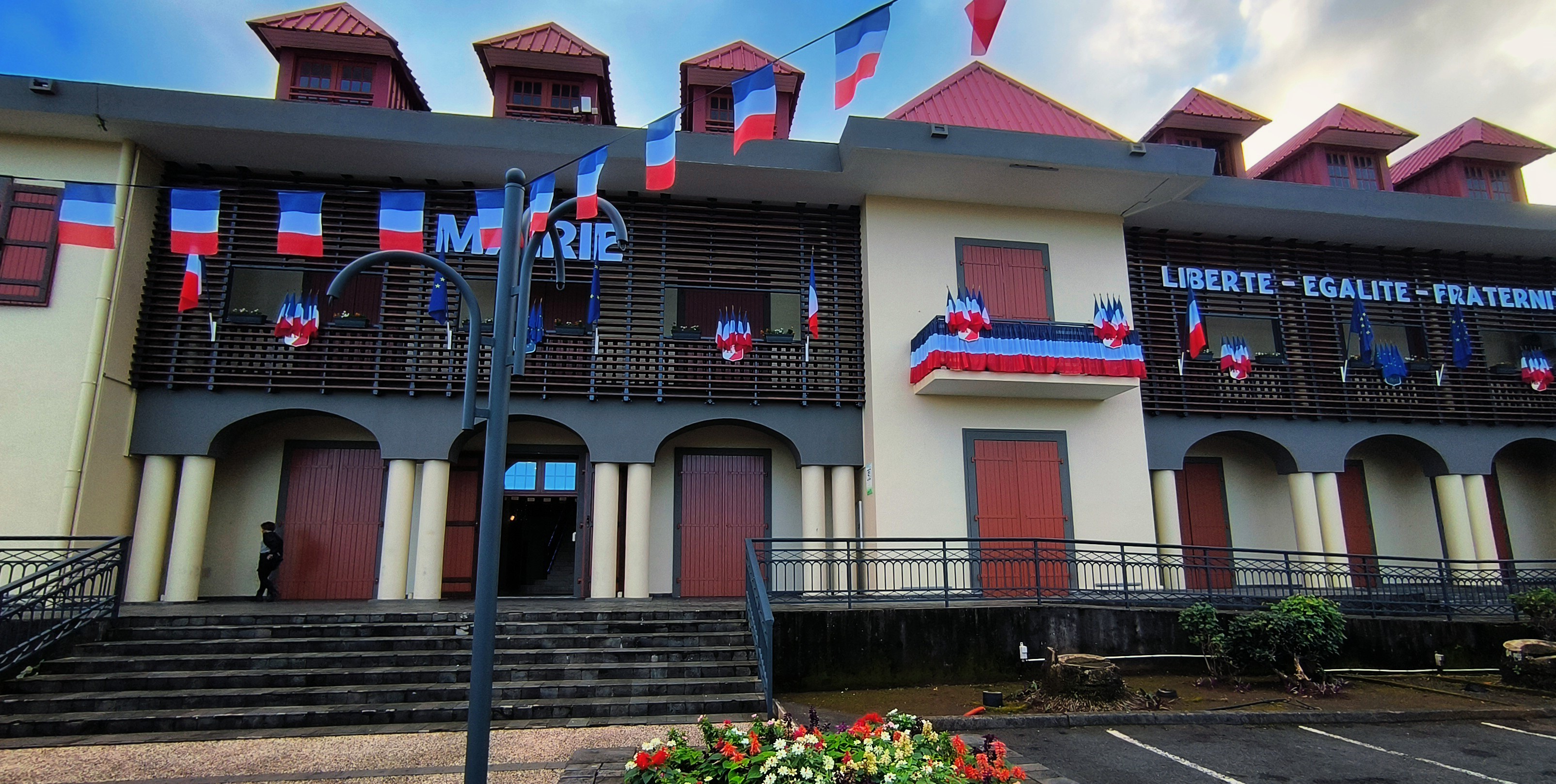
- The main frontage of the Hôtel de Ville in August 2026

General information
- Type: City hall
- Architectural style: Neoclassical style
- Location: Saint-Joseph, Réunion, France
- Coordinates: 21.3785°S 55.6192°E
- Completed: 1953

The Hôtel de Ville (French pronunciation: [otɛl də vil], City Hall) is a municipal building in Saint-Joseph, Réunion, in the Indian Ocean, standing on Rue Raphaël-Babet.

== History ==
The town experienced its first significant period of development after 1830, when the Grands Bois sugar factory commenced production at a site some 12 kilometres (7.5 mi) along the coast to the northwest from the town. This industrial production was supported by a large influx of indentured workers from South India known as the Malbars. In this context, a justice of the peace court, which also acted as the venue for town council meetings, was established in the town in the mid-19th century. The site the council selected faced the Church of Saint-Joseph which was completed in 1851.

In 1947, following further population growth, the council led by the mayor, Raphaël Babet, decided to redevelop the town centre and to erect a new town hall on the site of the old justice of the peace court. The foundation stone for the new building was laid by the prefect, Paul Demange, on 20 November 1949. It was designed in the neoclassical style, built in brick with a cement render finish and was officially opened by Babet on 25 December 1953. The design involved a symmetrical main frontage of five bays facing onto the street with the end bays projected forward as pavilions. The central section of three bays featured three square-headed doorways, which were recessed under a canopy supported by paired columns: on the first floor, there were three more square-headed doorways, which were also recessed in a similar way, creating a balcony. The outer bays were fenestrated by casement windows with shutters on both floors and, at roof level, there was a cornice. Above the central section, there was a parapet.

In the 1980s, the building was extended, replicating the original design and therefore doubling its frontage, such that it had a symmetrical main frontage of nine bays facing onto the street, with the central bay and the end bays projected forward as pavilions. The central bay featured a new pyramid-shaped roof. Internally, the principal room was the Salle du Conseil (council chamber).
