= Vincendo =

Village on the island of Réunion

Vicendo
- Village
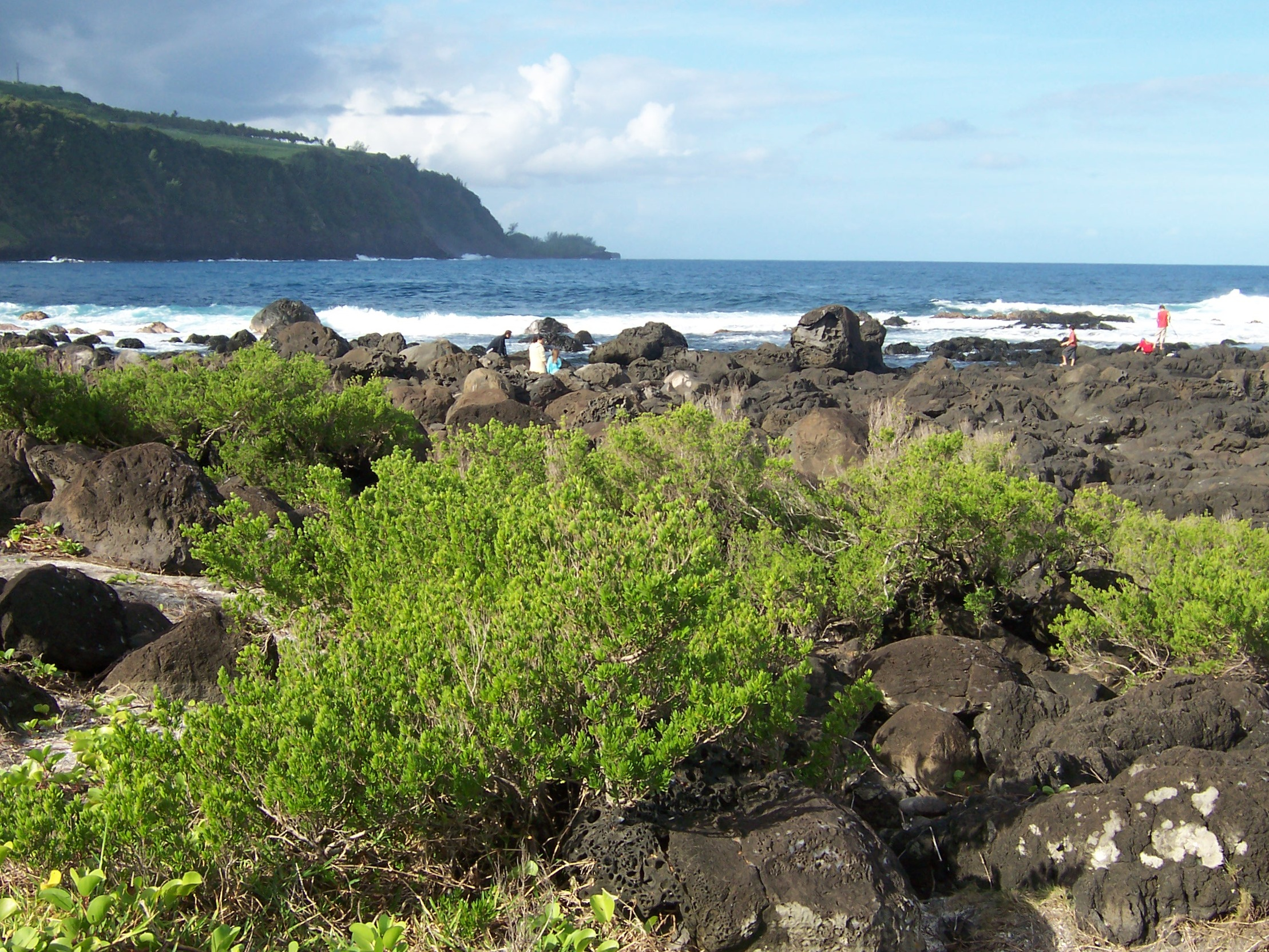
- Pemphis acidula on the coastline

- Location within Réunion
- Coordinates: 21°22′17″S 55°40′14″E
- Country: France (territory)
- Department/Island: Réunion
- Time zone: UTC+04:00

Vincendo is a village on the island of Réunion, located in the Saint-Pierre Arrondissment and the commune of Saint-Joseph on the southern coast of the island.

Vincendo has a black sand beach and bed and breakfast accommodations.
