= Hôtel de Ville, Saint-Pierre, Réunion =

Town hall in Saint-Pierre, Réunion, France

Hôtel de Ville
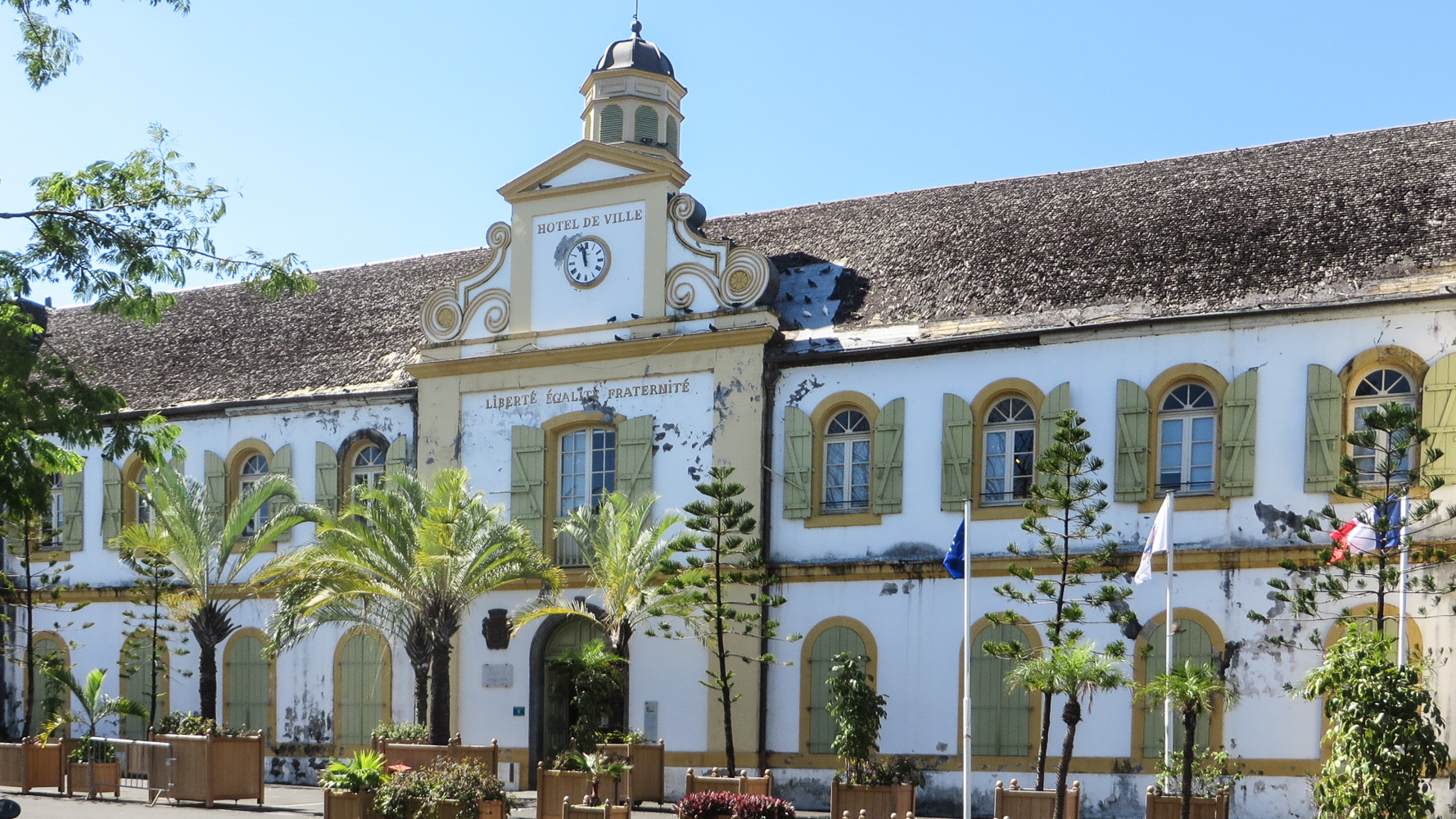
- The main frontage of the Hôtel de Ville in July 2018

General information
- Type: City hall
- Architectural style: Neoclassical style
- Location: Saint-Pierre, Réunion, France
- Coordinates: 21.3418°S 55.4778°E
- Completed: 1773

Monument historique
- Official name: Hôtel de ville
- Type: Inscrit
- Designated: 1982
- Reference no.: PA00105829

The Hôtel de Ville (French pronunciation: [otɛl də vil], City Hall) is a municipal building in Saint-Pierre, Réunion, in the Indian Ocean, standing on Rue Meziaire Guignard. It was designated a monument historique by the French government in 1982.

== History ==
In 1735, the governor of Réunion, Bertrand-François Mahé de La Bourdonnais, appointed Gabriel Dejean as the new head of the Saint-Pierre district. In March 1736, Dejean published a plan for the redevelopment of the town centre with new roads and buildings. As part of this plan, a new coffee store to be operated by the French Indies Company was authorised by Cyr Honoré de Crémont, who was the local intendant and, as such, the king's representative in the town. Construction started in 1751, but progress was slow: it was built in rubble masonry with a cement render, but it was only after pressure from local coffee merchants that the building was completed in 1773.

The design involved a rectangular building, located not far from the harbour of Saint-Pierre. It would originally have had a flat roof made of "argamasse", a type of mortar developed by the French East India Company by mixing sand, crushed brick, lime, egg whites, curdled milk and fats, so that the roof could be used for drying coffee beans.

In 1825, the town council, which had previously operated without a dedicated town hall, decided to use the building as its regular meeting place. The use of the building for municipal purposes was regularised in 1828, when the mayor, Urbain Marin, persuaded the minister for the colonies, Christophe de Chabrol de Crouzol to transfer ownership from the French Government to the town council. Marin then initiated a series of improvements to make the building more appropriate for municipal use. These improvements included replacing the flat roof, which was dilapidated and severely leaking, with a pitched roof. They also included installing a pair of full height pilasters, flanking the central bay, to support a central pediment. The pediment contained a clock and was supported by scrolls, and an octagonal belfry was placed behind it. A landscaping scheme for the area in front of the building, with a fountain designed and manufactured by Fonderies d'Art Ducel in the centre of the garden, was instigated in 1861.

During the municipal elections in August 1913, the building was attacked and ransacked, and the town council was subsequently dissolved by the governor of Réunion, Hubert Auguste Garbit.

A statue by the sculptor, Jean Boucher, intended to commemorate the lives of local service personnel who had died in the First World War, was unveiled at the north end of the garden in the 1920s, and a statue depicting the former politician, François de Mahy, was unveiled at the south end of the garden on 22 July 1934. A programme of works to restore the exterior of the building was completed in 2022.
