= Raphaël Babet =

French politician

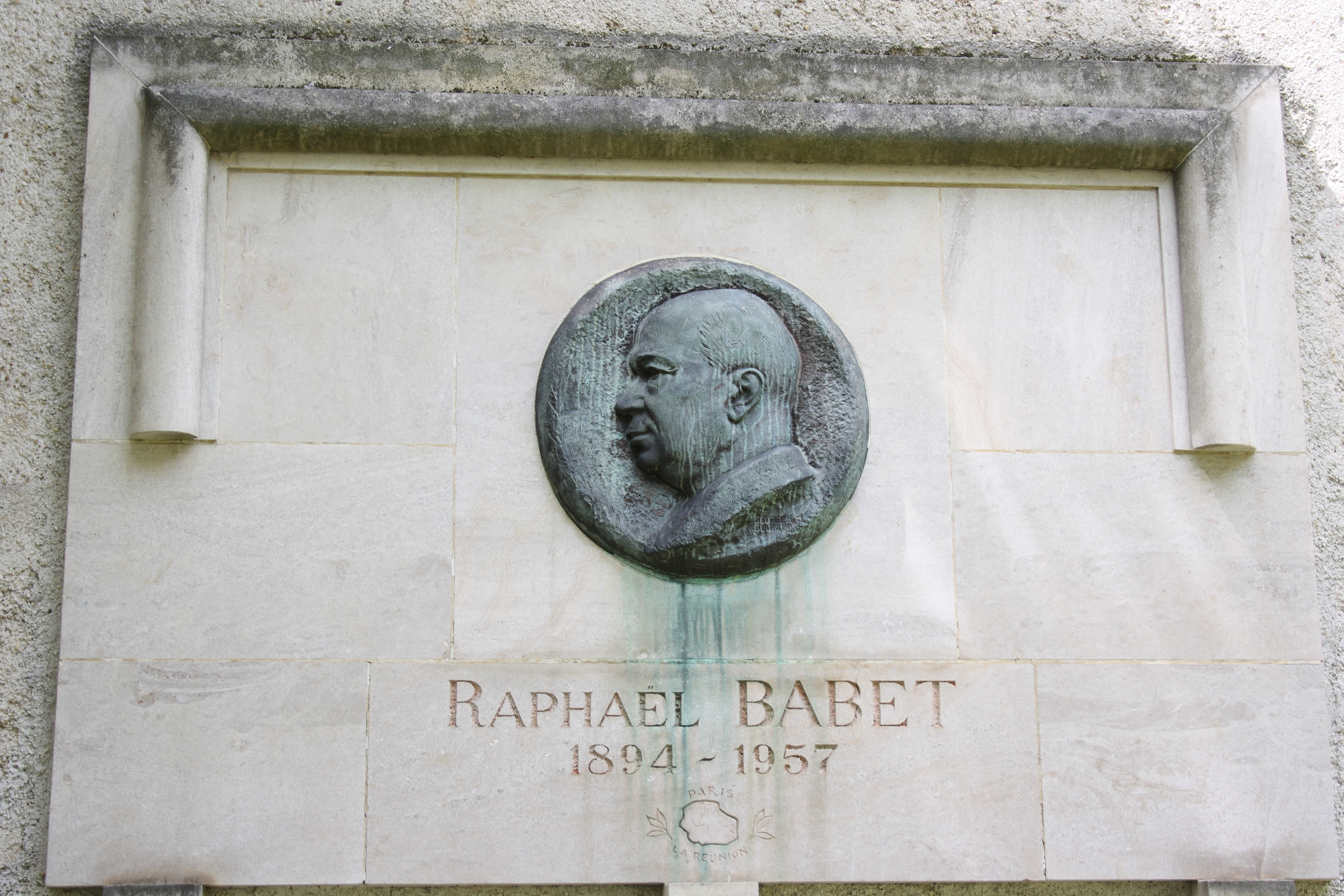
- Plaque commemorating Babet in the Square d`Alleray, Paris

Personal details
- Born: 27 June 1894 Saint-Pierre, Reunion
- Died: 30 August 1957 (aged 63) Saint-Joseph, Reunion
- Occupation: Politician

Raphaël Babet (27 June 1894 – 30 August 1957) was a French politician.

Babet was born in Saint-Pierre, Réunion. He represented the Democratic and Socialist Union of the Resistance (UDSR) in the Constituent Assembly elected in 1946 and in the National Assembly from 1946 to 1957.

He is also remembered for his work in founding the new town of Babetville on the Sakay river in Madagascar, for settlers from La Réunion.

== Biography ==
Raphaël Babet is credited with overseeing the development and modernization of the downtown area of the town of Saint-Joseph, Réunion, where he served as mayor from 1947 to 1957.

He is also known for initiating a project to establish a new town in Madagascar by people from Réunion. This project was launched in 1953 and is known locally as Sakay River. The small town developed within this framework until 1977, when it was renamed Ankadinondry Sakay in his honor.
