= Saint-Pierre Pierrefonds Airport =

Airport in Réunion

Pierrefonds Airport Aéroport de Saint-Pierre - Pierrefonds
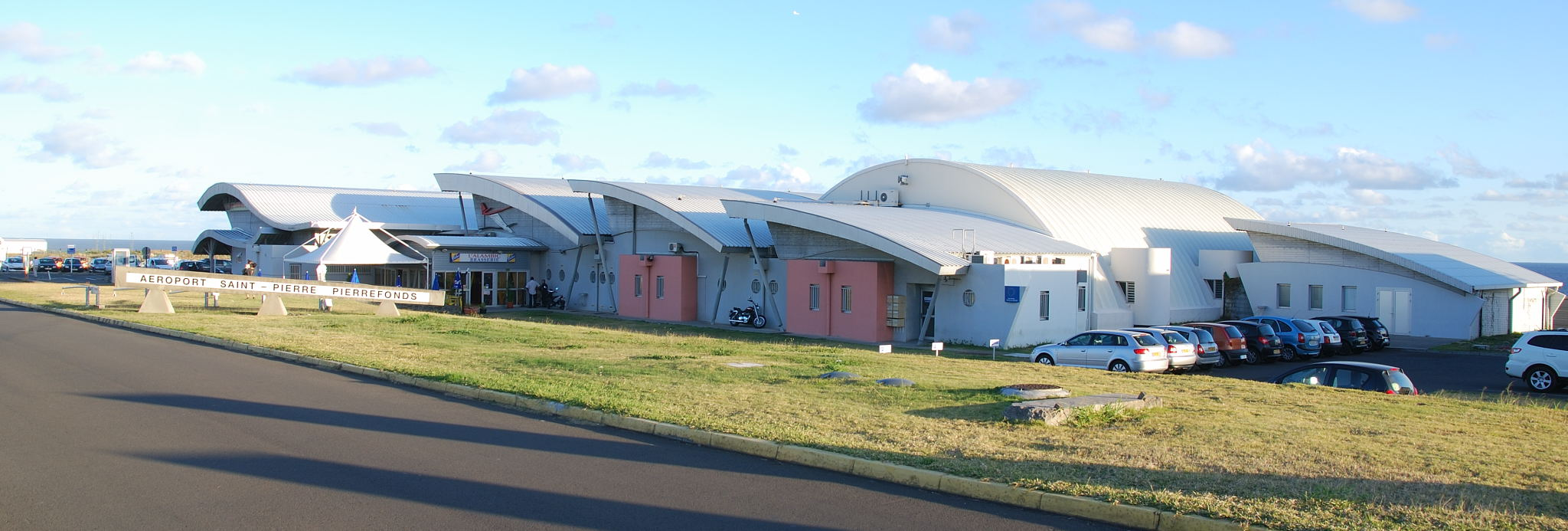
- IATA: ZSE; ICAO: FMEP

Summary
- Airport type: Public
- Serves: Saint-Pierre, Réunion
- Focus city for: Air Austral
- Elevation AMSL: 18 m (59 ft)
- Coordinates: 21°19′18″S 055°25′32″E

Map
- Location within Réunion

Runways
Direction	Length		Surface
Direction	m	ft	Surface
15/33	2,100	6,890	Asphalt

Statistics (2018)
- Passengers: 98,194
- Passenger traffic change: ▼2.6%
- Aircraft movements: 1,990
- Aircraft movements change: ▼13.4%
- Source: French AIP, DAFIF, Statistics

Pierrefonds Airport (French: Aéroport de Saint-Pierre - Pierrefonds) (IATA: ZSE, ICAO: FMEP) is an airport located 5.5 kilometres (3 NM) west-northwest of Saint-Pierre in Réunion. It is the smaller of the two airports located on the island, Roland Garros Airport being the other. The distance between the two airports is 49 km (30 mi) by air and 82 km (51 mi) by road.

Réunion is a French island located in the Indian Ocean, east of Madagascar and about 200 kilometres (110 NM) southwest of Mauritius. In 2008, the airport served 135,000 passengers.

== Facilities ==
The airport resides at an elevation of 18 metres (60 ft) above mean sea level. It has one runway designated 15/33 with an asphalt surface measuring 2,100 by 45 metres (6,890 ft × 148 ft).

== Airlines and destinations ==
Airlines	Destinations
Fly Vetiv'Air	Durban

== See also ==
- Roland Garros Airport
