= Saint-Pierre, Réunion =

Subprefecture and commune in Réunion, France

Saint-Pierre Sin-Pyè (Réunion Creole French)
- Subprefecture and commune
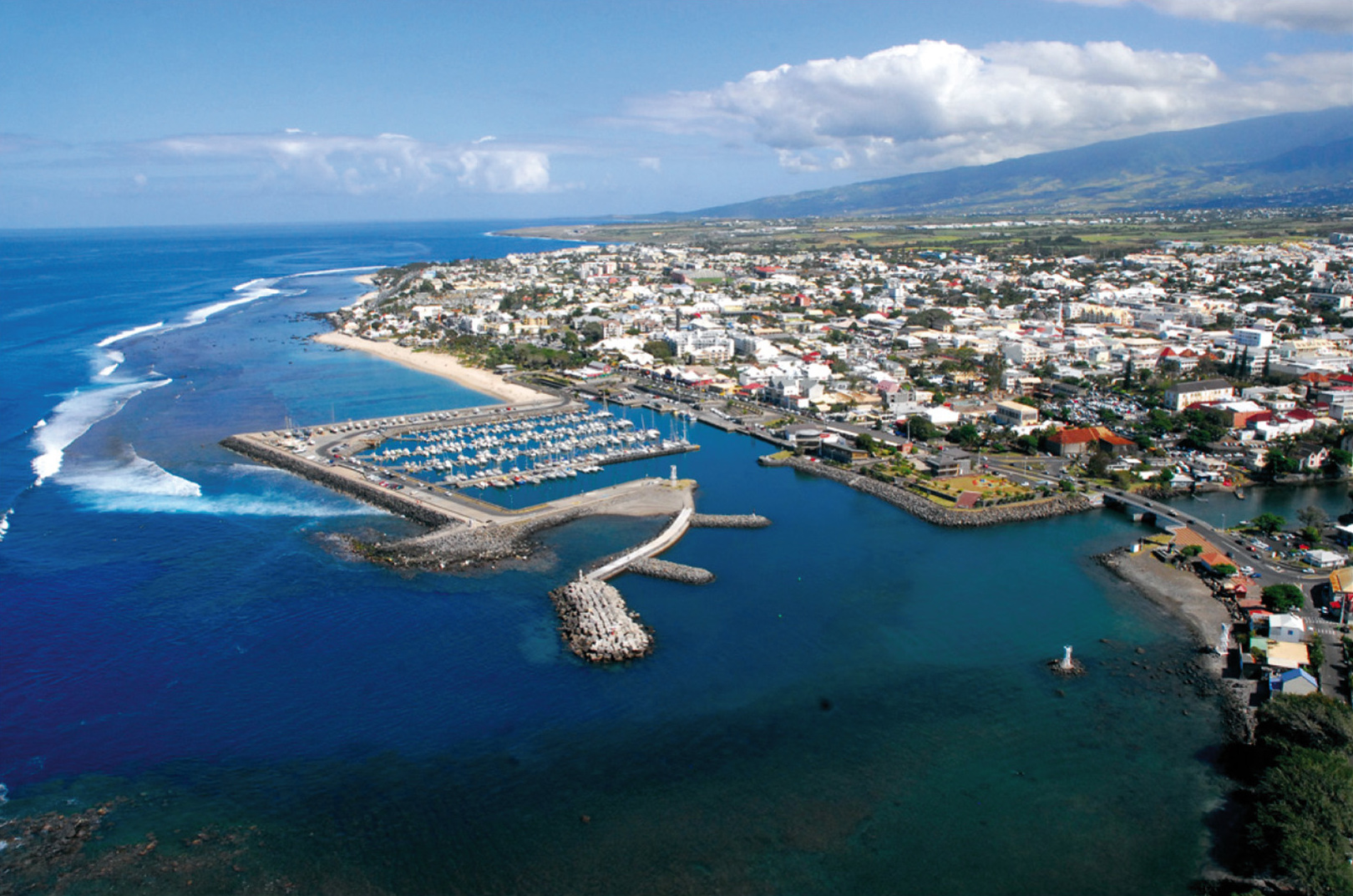
- An aerial view of part of Saint-Pierre and its port

- Flag Coat of arms
- Motto: Fortis fortuna fortior (Latin: 'Courage is stronger than fortune')
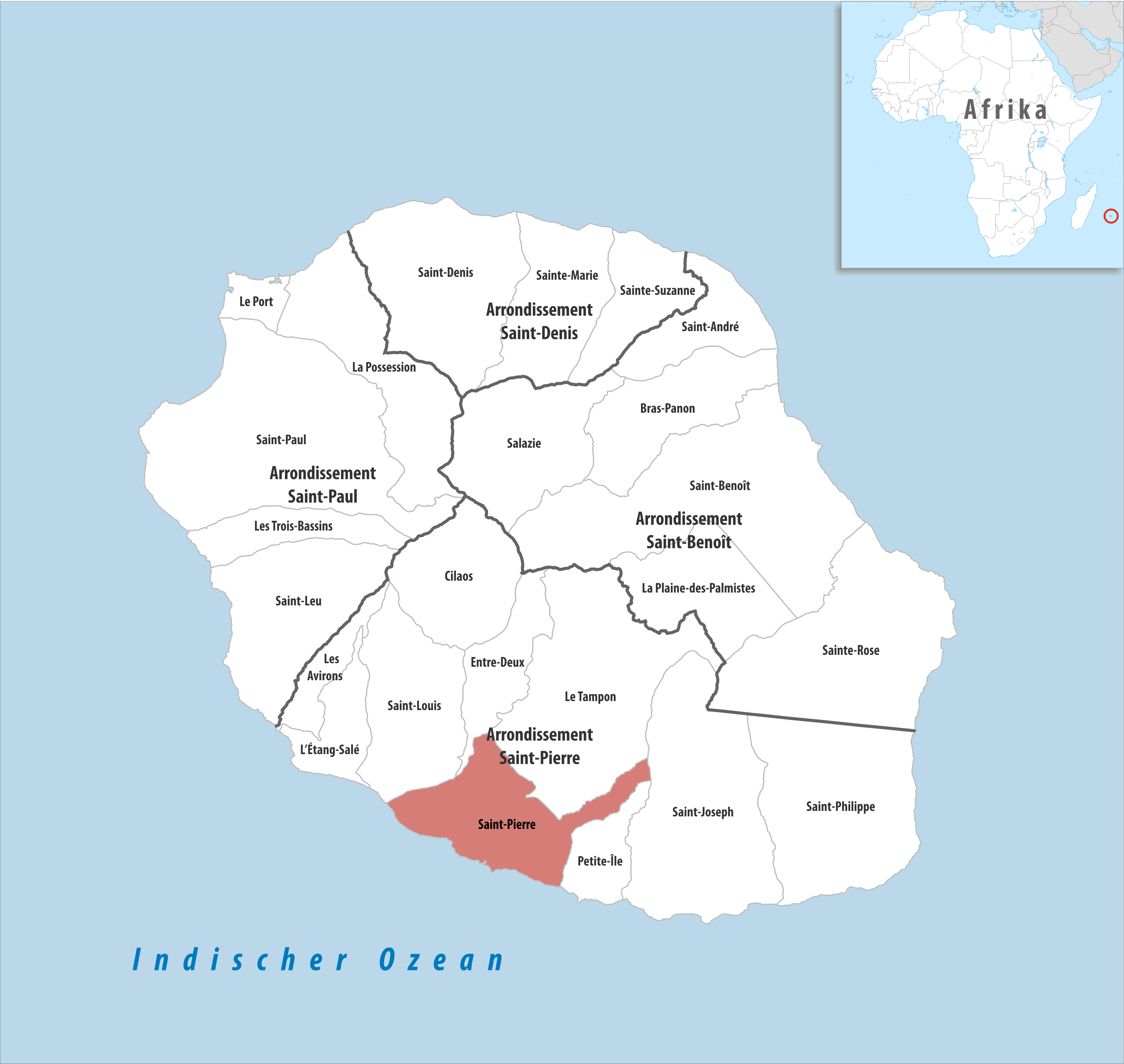
- Location of Saint-Pierre
- Coordinates: 21°20′31″S 55°28′40″E
- Country: France
- Overseas region and department: Réunion
- Arrondissement: Saint-Pierre
- Canton: Saint-Pierre-1, 2 and 3
- Intercommunality: Villes solidaires
- Area^{1}: 95.99 km^{2} (37.06 sq mi)
- Elevation: 19 m (62 ft)
- Highest elevation: 1,642 m (5,387 ft)
- Lowest elevation: 0 m (0 ft)
- Population (2023): 85,038
  - Density: 885.9/km^{2} (2,294/sq mi)
- Time zone: UTC+04:00
- INSEE/Postal code: 97416 /97410
- ^{1} French Land Register data, which excludes lakes, ponds, glaciers > 1 km^{2} (0.386 sq mi or 247 acres) and river estuaries.

Saint-Pierre (French pronunciation: [sɛ̃ pjɛʁ]; Reunionese Creole: Sin-Pyè) is the third-largest commune in the French overseas department and region of Réunion. Located on the southwest side of the island, it is the headquarters of the French Southern and Antarctic Lands.

== History ==
It developed from a port built from 1854 to 1882, which was used for the trade between Asia and Europe. Today, it features 400 sites for fishing and pleasure boats, while most of the commercial traffic moved north to Le Port. The Hôtel de Ville was completed in 1773.

== Geography ==
The town of Saint-Pierre is at the beginning of the only major road N3 across the island. From here, the road leads to Le Tampon, La Plaine des Cafres and Bourg Murat. From that area, there is a relatively easy access to the Piton de la Fournaise and a starting point of many excursions.

=== Climate ===
Saint-Pierre has a hot semi-arid climate (Köppen climate classification BSh), while Ligne Paradis and Ravine des Cabris's climate type has tropical savanna climate (Köppen climate classification Aw) in the southeast of the area. The average annual temperature in Saint-Pierre (downtown) is 24.1 °C (75.4 °F). The average annual rainfall is 672.1 mm (26.46 in) with February as the wettest month. The temperatures are highest on average in January, at around 27.3 °C (81.1 °F), and lowest in July, at around 20.9 °C (69.6 °F). The highest temperature ever recorded in Saint-Pierre (downtown) was 35.7 °C (96.3 °F) on 20 February 2007; the coldest temperature ever recorded was 12.6 °C (54.7 °F) on 15 September 2020.

Climate data for Saint-Pierre (downtown, altitude 61m, 1991–2020 normals, extremes 1997−present)
Month	Jan	Feb	Mar	Apr	May	Jun	Jul	Aug	Sep	Oct	Nov	Dec	Year
Record high °C (°F)	35.6 (96.1)	35.7 (96.3)	34.5 (94.1)	33.2 (91.8)	32.0 (89.6)	30.5 (86.9)	31.5 (88.7)	29.4 (84.9)	30.7 (87.3)	31.7 (89.1)	32.8 (91.0)	34.9 (94.8)	35.7 (96.3)
Mean daily maximum °C (°F)	31.6 (88.9)	31.6 (88.9)	31.1 (88.0)	29.9 (85.8)	28.2 (82.8)	26.5 (79.7)	25.6 (78.1)	26.0 (78.8)	26.8 (80.2)	28.0 (82.4)	29.5 (85.1)	30.9 (87.6)	28.8 (83.8)
Daily mean °C (°F)	27.1 (80.8)	27.1 (80.8)	26.5 (79.7)	25.3 (77.5)	23.6 (74.5)	21.8 (71.2)	20.9 (69.6)	21.0 (69.8)	21.7 (71.1)	23.0 (73.4)	24.5 (76.1)	26.1 (79.0)	24.1 (75.4)
Mean daily minimum °C (°F)	22.5 (72.5)	22.6 (72.7)	21.9 (71.4)	20.7 (69.3)	19.0 (66.2)	17.1 (62.8)	16.2 (61.2)	16.0 (60.8)	16.6 (61.9)	18.0 (64.4)	19.6 (67.3)	21.3 (70.3)	19.3 (66.7)
Record low °C (°F)	18.4 (65.1)	17.6 (63.7)	17.8 (64.0)	16.6 (61.9)	14.7 (58.5)	13.4 (56.1)	13.1 (55.6)	12.9 (55.2)	12.6 (54.7)	14.5 (58.1)	15.7 (60.3)	17.1 (62.8)	12.6 (54.7)
Average precipitation mm (inches)	108.7 (4.28)	116.1 (4.57)	97.2 (3.83)	74.8 (2.94)	47.7 (1.88)	49.5 (1.95)	53.4 (2.10)	25.6 (1.01)	20.5 (0.81)	17.3 (0.68)	30.9 (1.22)	53.0 (2.09)	694.7 (27.35)
Average precipitation days (≥ 1.0 mm)	7.1	8.3	8.0	6.7	5.5	6.2	6.1	3.7	2.8	2.5	2.6	4.4	63.9
Source: Météo France

Climate data for Saint-Pierre (Pierrefonds Airport, altitude 21m, 1991–2020 normals, extremes 1999–present)
Month	Jan	Feb	Mar	Apr	May	Jun	Jul	Aug	Sep	Oct	Nov	Dec	Year
Record high °C (°F)	35.8 (96.4)	35.1 (95.2)	34.8 (94.6)	33.1 (91.6)	32.0 (89.6)	29.9 (85.8)	30.5 (86.9)	28.6 (83.5)	28.6 (83.5)	30.6 (87.1)	32.1 (89.8)	33.8 (92.8)	35.8 (96.4)
Mean daily maximum °C (°F)	31.3 (88.3)	31.1 (88.0)	30.7 (87.3)	29.6 (85.3)	27.9 (82.2)	26.3 (79.3)	25.3 (77.5)	25.6 (78.1)	26.3 (79.3)	27.7 (81.9)	29.0 (84.2)	30.5 (86.9)	28.4 (83.1)
Daily mean °C (°F)	27.5 (81.5)	27.5 (81.5)	27.0 (80.6)	25.9 (78.6)	24.2 (75.6)	22.5 (72.5)	21.5 (70.7)	21.6 (70.9)	22.3 (72.1)	23.6 (74.5)	25.0 (77.0)	26.7 (80.1)	24.6 (76.3)
Mean daily minimum °C (°F)	23.8 (74.8)	23.8 (74.8)	23.3 (73.9)	22.1 (71.8)	20.5 (68.9)	18.7 (65.7)	17.7 (63.9)	17.6 (63.7)	18.2 (64.8)	19.5 (67.1)	21.0 (69.8)	22.8 (73.0)	20.8 (69.4)
Record low °C (°F)	20.4 (68.7)	20.1 (68.2)	20.2 (68.4)	18.7 (65.7)	15.7 (60.3)	14.6 (58.3)	14.2 (57.6)	13.8 (56.8)	14.7 (58.5)	15.1 (59.2)	16.5 (61.7)	18.8 (65.8)	13.8 (56.8)
Average precipitation mm (inches)	100.5 (3.96)	110.3 (4.34)	95.9 (3.78)	72.9 (2.87)	44.2 (1.74)	49.8 (1.96)	50.2 (1.98)	27.6 (1.09)	19.5 (0.77)	17.8 (0.70)	28.8 (1.13)	45.9 (1.81)	663.4 (26.12)
Average precipitation days (≥ 1.0 mm)	6.7	7.8	7.4	6.6	5.2	6.2	6.3	3.7	2.7	2.5	2.2	4.1	61.4
Source: Météo France

Climate data for Saint-Pierre (Ligne Paradis, altitude 156m, 1991–2020 normals, extremes 1966–present)
Month	Jan	Feb	Mar	Apr	May	Jun	Jul	Aug	Sep	Oct	Nov	Dec	Year
Record high °C (°F)	34.7 (94.5)	35.3 (95.5)	34.5 (94.1)	33.1 (91.6)	31.9 (89.4)	31.0 (87.8)	31.3 (88.3)	29.3 (84.7)	30.6 (87.1)	31.9 (89.4)	33.2 (91.8)	35.0 (95.0)	35.3 (95.5)
Mean daily maximum °C (°F)	31.0 (87.8)	30.8 (87.4)	30.3 (86.5)	29.2 (84.6)	27.5 (81.5)	25.7 (78.3)	24.8 (76.6)	25.2 (77.4)	26.2 (79.2)	27.5 (81.5)	28.8 (83.8)	30.2 (86.4)	28.1 (82.6)
Daily mean °C (°F)	26.6 (79.9)	26.5 (79.7)	25.9 (78.6)	24.8 (76.6)	23.1 (73.6)	21.3 (70.3)	20.4 (68.7)	20.6 (69.1)	21.4 (70.5)	22.6 (72.7)	24.0 (75.2)	25.6 (78.1)	23.6 (74.5)
Mean daily minimum °C (°F)	22.1 (71.8)	22.2 (72.0)	21.6 (70.9)	20.5 (68.9)	18.7 (65.7)	17.0 (62.6)	16.0 (60.8)	15.9 (60.6)	16.5 (61.7)	17.8 (64.0)	19.3 (66.7)	21.0 (69.8)	19.1 (66.4)
Record low °C (°F)	17.1 (62.8)	18.0 (64.4)	17.3 (63.1)	15.5 (59.9)	14.9 (58.8)	13.4 (56.1)	12.0 (53.6)	12.2 (54.0)	12.1 (53.8)	13.0 (55.4)	15.0 (59.0)	15.5 (59.9)	12.0 (53.6)
Average precipitation mm (inches)	146.4 (5.76)	144.7 (5.70)	127.5 (5.02)	101.2 (3.98)	72.2 (2.84)	66.5 (2.62)	81.8 (3.22)	41.1 (1.62)	32.3 (1.27)	28.8 (1.13)	41.7 (1.64)	71.4 (2.81)	955.6 (37.62)
Average precipitation days (≥ 1.0 mm)	8.3	9.3	8.7	7.7	6.6	7.4	7.7	4.7	3.6	3.0	2.9	5.2	75.1
Mean monthly sunshine hours	240.8	199.0	219.6	208.3	220.8	213.9	235.5	241.9	229.2	240.9	255.2	232.4	2,737.3
Source 1: Météo France
Source 2: Meteociel.fr (sunshine 1981-2010)

Climate data for Saint-Pierre (Ravine des Cabris, altitude 310m, 1991–2020 normals, extremes 1997–present)
Month	Jan	Feb	Mar	Apr	May	Jun	Jul	Aug	Sep	Oct	Nov	Dec	Year
Record high °C (°F)	34.1 (93.4)	34.2 (93.6)	34.3 (93.7)	33.7 (92.7)	31.0 (87.8)	29.8 (85.6)	29.2 (84.6)	28.6 (83.5)	29.7 (85.5)	30.5 (86.9)	33.2 (91.8)	32.8 (91.0)	34.3 (93.7)
Mean daily maximum °C (°F)	29.9 (85.8)	30.1 (86.2)	29.8 (85.6)	28.8 (83.8)	27.0 (80.6)	25.3 (77.5)	24.5 (76.1)	24.9 (76.8)	25.4 (77.7)	26.4 (79.5)	27.7 (81.9)	29.0 (84.2)	27.4 (81.3)
Daily mean °C (°F)	25.2 (77.4)	25.4 (77.7)	24.9 (76.8)	23.8 (74.8)	22.0 (71.6)	20.1 (68.2)	19.2 (66.6)	19.5 (67.1)	20.0 (68.0)	21.2 (70.2)	22.6 (72.7)	24.2 (75.6)	22.3 (72.1)
Mean daily minimum °C (°F)	20.6 (69.1)	20.7 (69.3)	20.0 (68.0)	18.7 (65.7)	16.9 (62.4)	15.0 (59.0)	14.0 (57.2)	14.0 (57.2)	14.6 (58.3)	15.9 (60.6)	17.5 (63.5)	19.3 (66.7)	17.3 (63.1)
Record low °C (°F)	16.2 (61.2)	16.3 (61.3)	16.0 (60.8)	14.1 (57.4)	12.7 (54.9)	11.1 (52.0)	9.2 (48.6)	10.1 (50.2)	10.7 (51.3)	11.5 (52.7)	12.8 (55.0)	15.5 (59.9)	9.2 (48.6)
Average precipitation mm (inches)	205.7 (8.10)	158.9 (6.26)	126.5 (4.98)	92.5 (3.64)	53.7 (2.11)	46.5 (1.83)	54.9 (2.16)	22.3 (0.88)	31.6 (1.24)	27.5 (1.08)	39.3 (1.55)	89.6 (3.53)	949.0 (37.36)
Average precipitation days (≥ 1.0 mm)	11.0	10.7	8.9	7.0	5.4	5.5	5.3	2.9	3.7	3.2	4.0	7.5	74.9
Source: Météo France

=== Transportation ===
Pierrefonds Airport is located 5.5 kilometres outside of the commune. Opened in 1999, this is a small airport for commercial traffic. It has an IATA code of ZSE.

== Population ==
Historical population
Year	Pop.	±% p.a.
1961	33,947	—
1967	40,355	+2.92%
1974	46,060	+1.91%
1982	50,082	+1.05%
1990	58,846	+2.04%
1999	68,915	+1.77%
2007	75,265	+1.11%
2012	80,823	+1.44%
2017	84,212	+0.82%
2023	85,038	+0.16%
Source: SPLAF and INSEE (1967-2023)

== Accommodations ==
There are no major hotels in Saint-Pierre. Comfort is only available at smaller houses such as converted Creole mansions and villas.

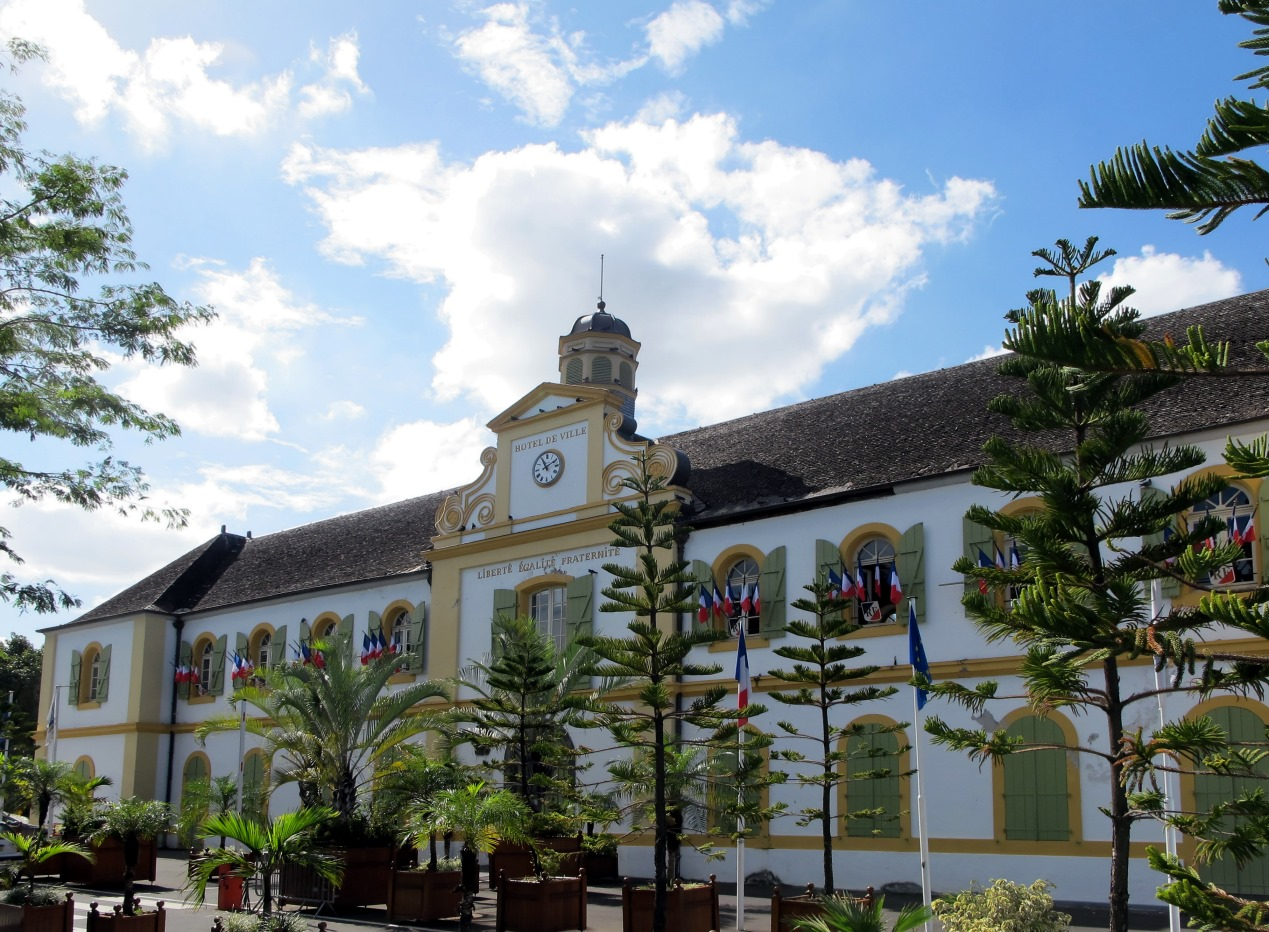
The Hôtel de Ville

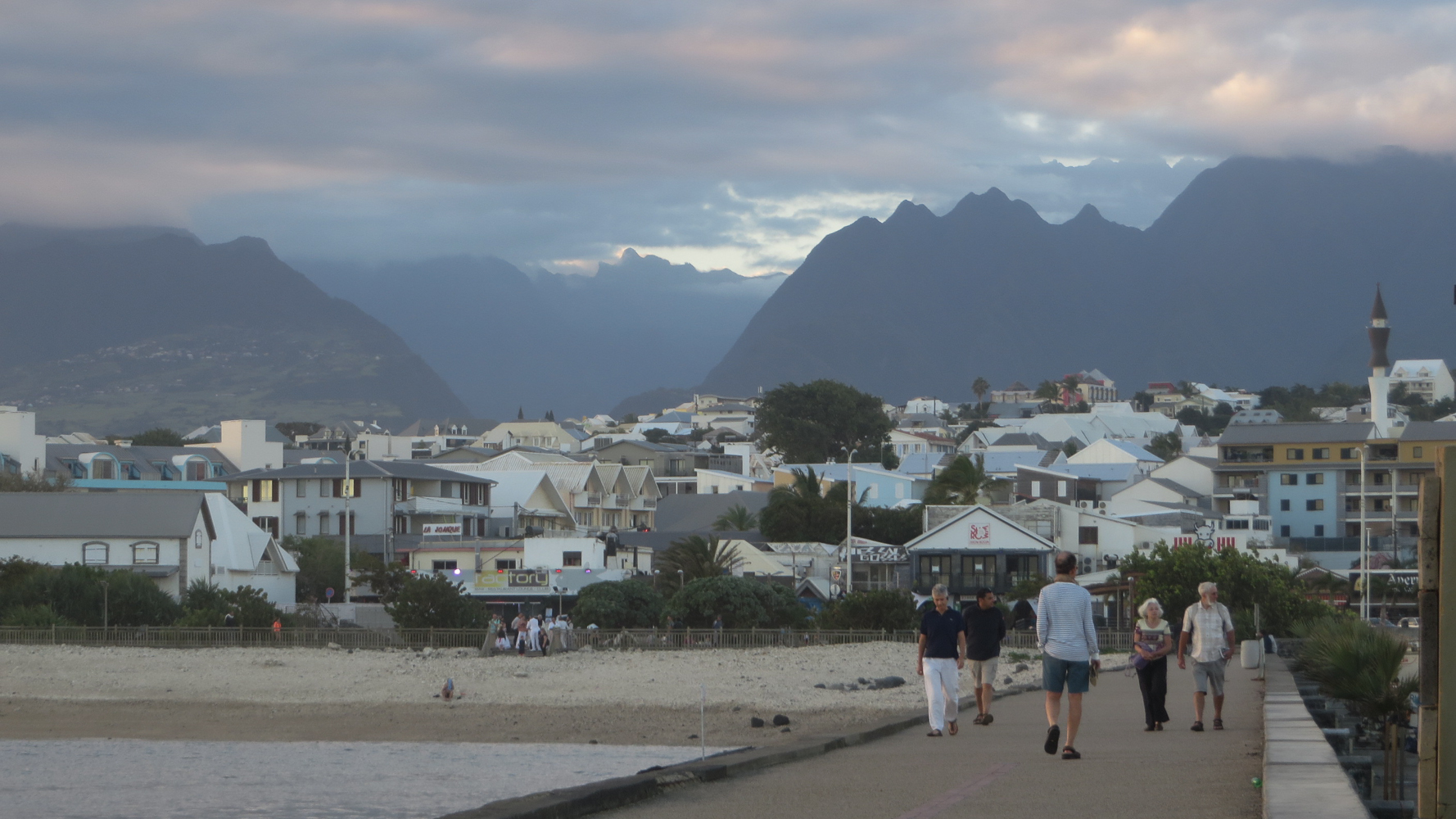
City of Saint-Pierre

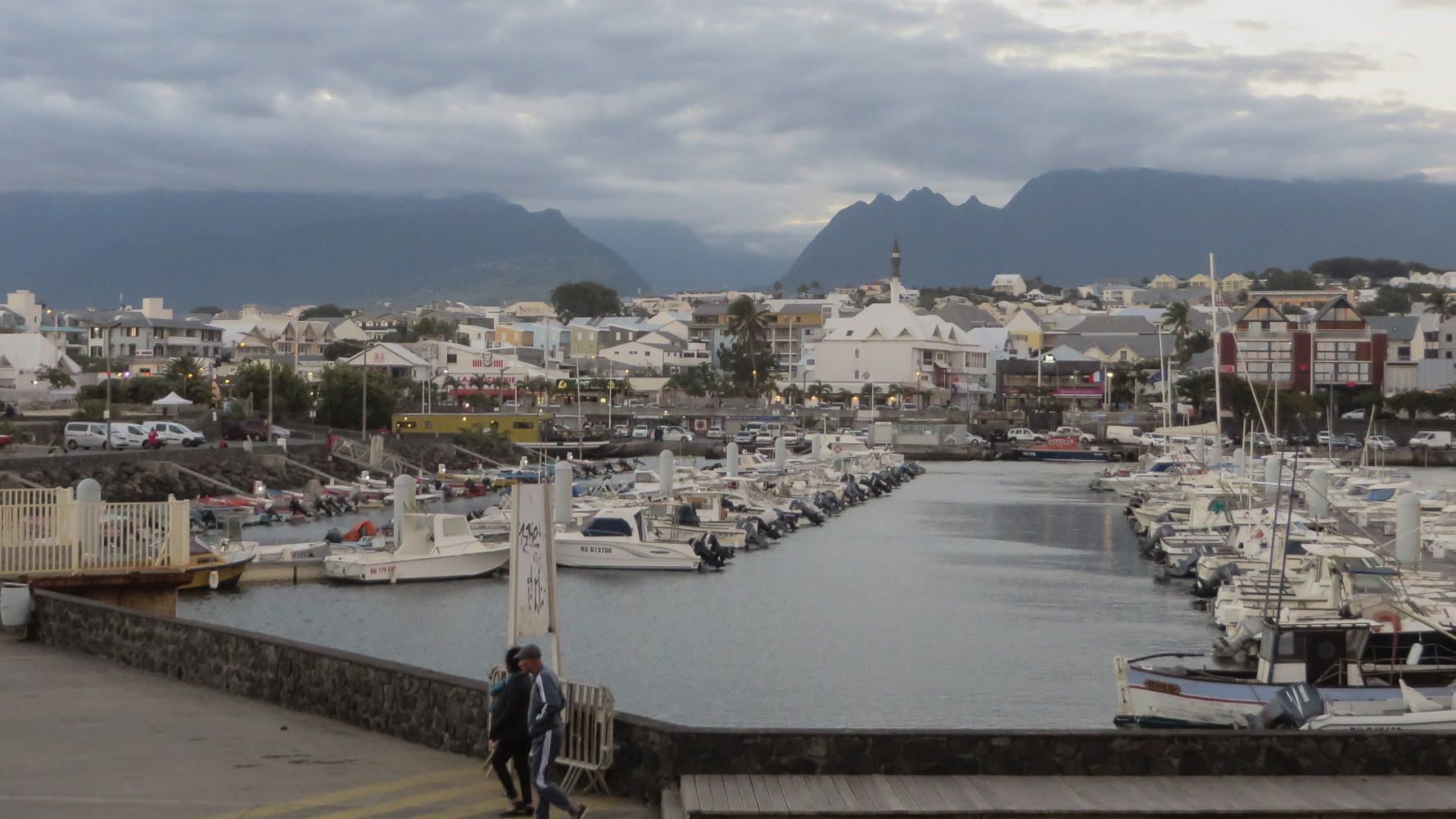
Port

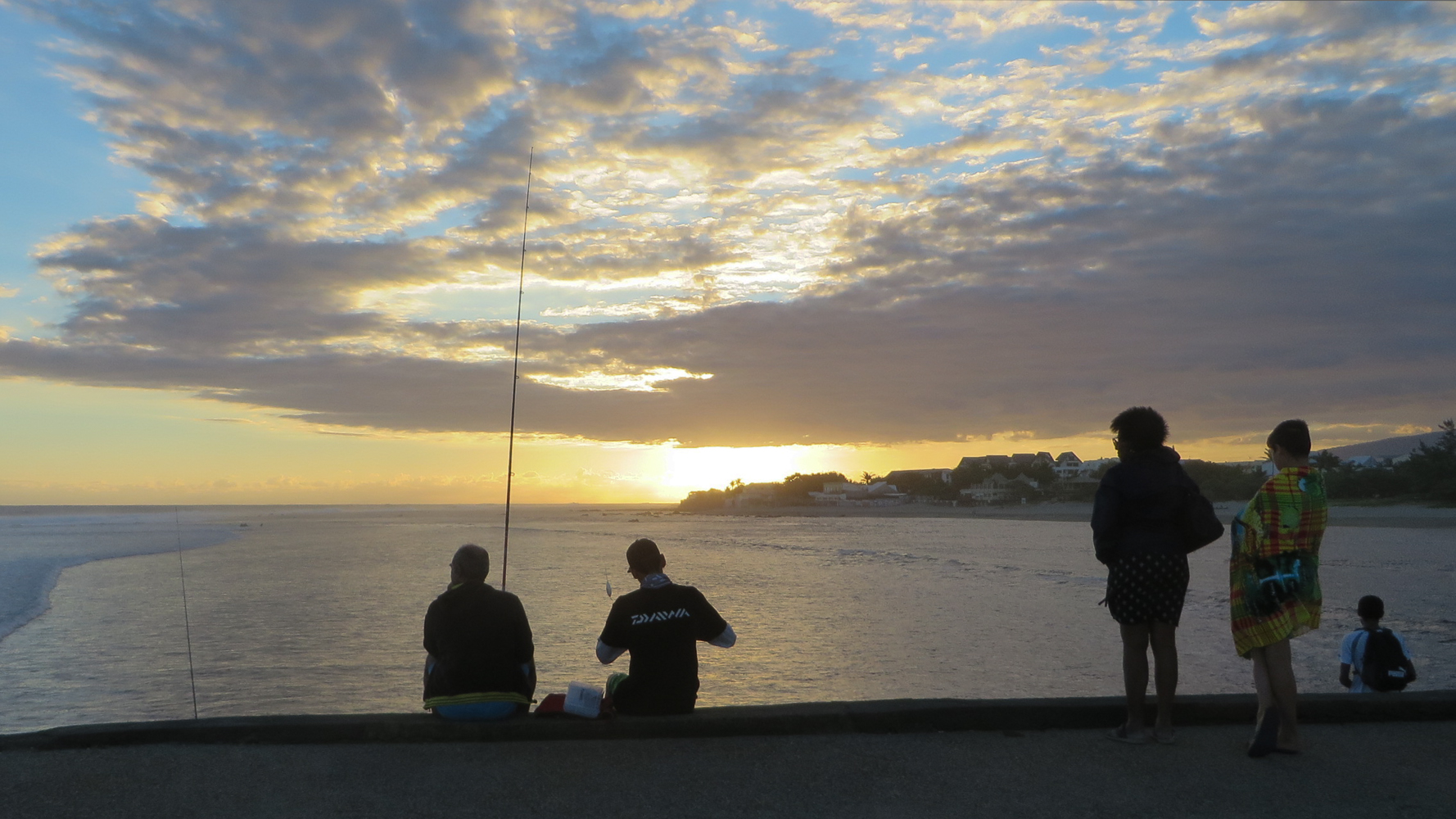
Beach in the evening

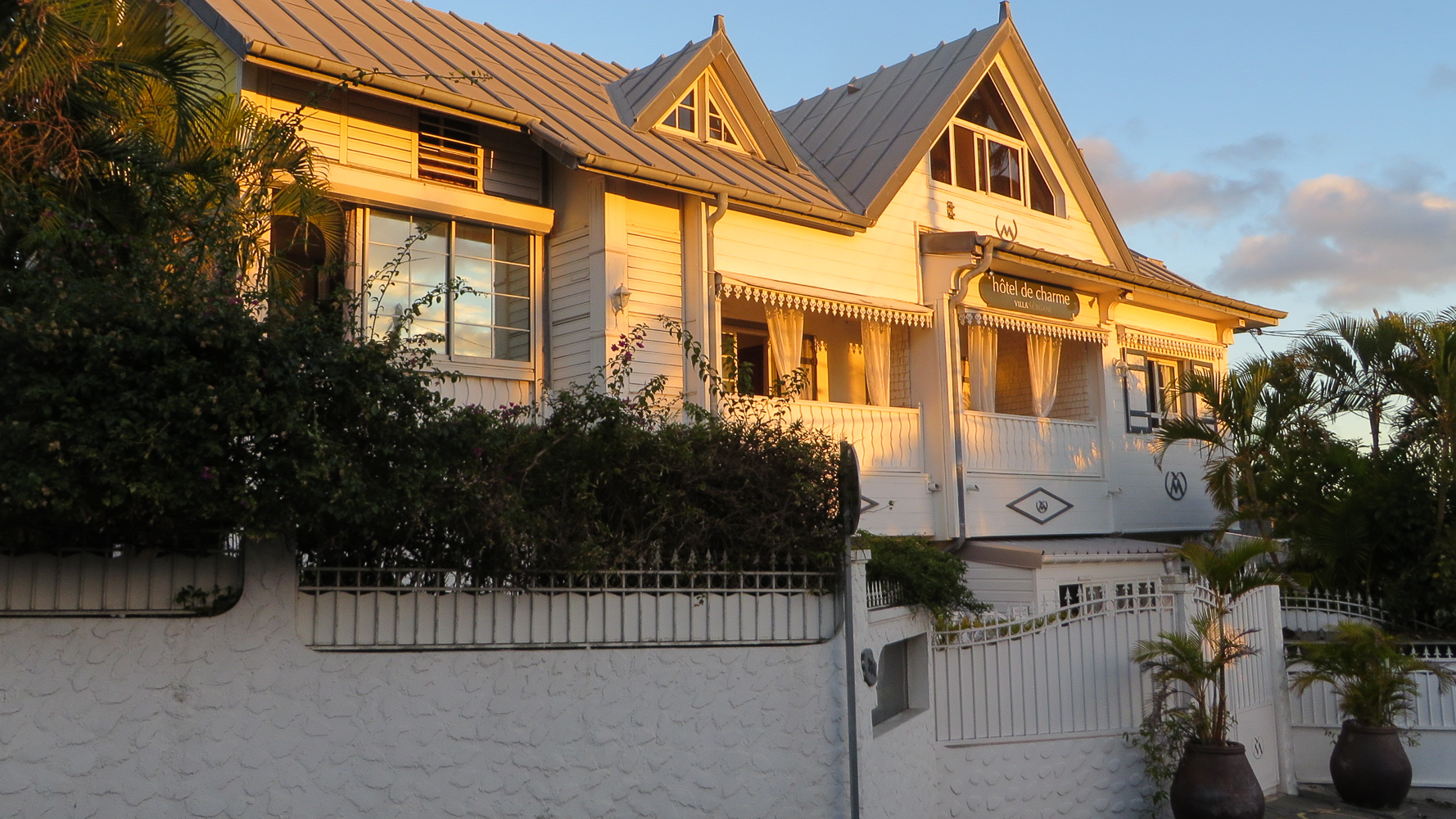
Hotel Villa Morgane

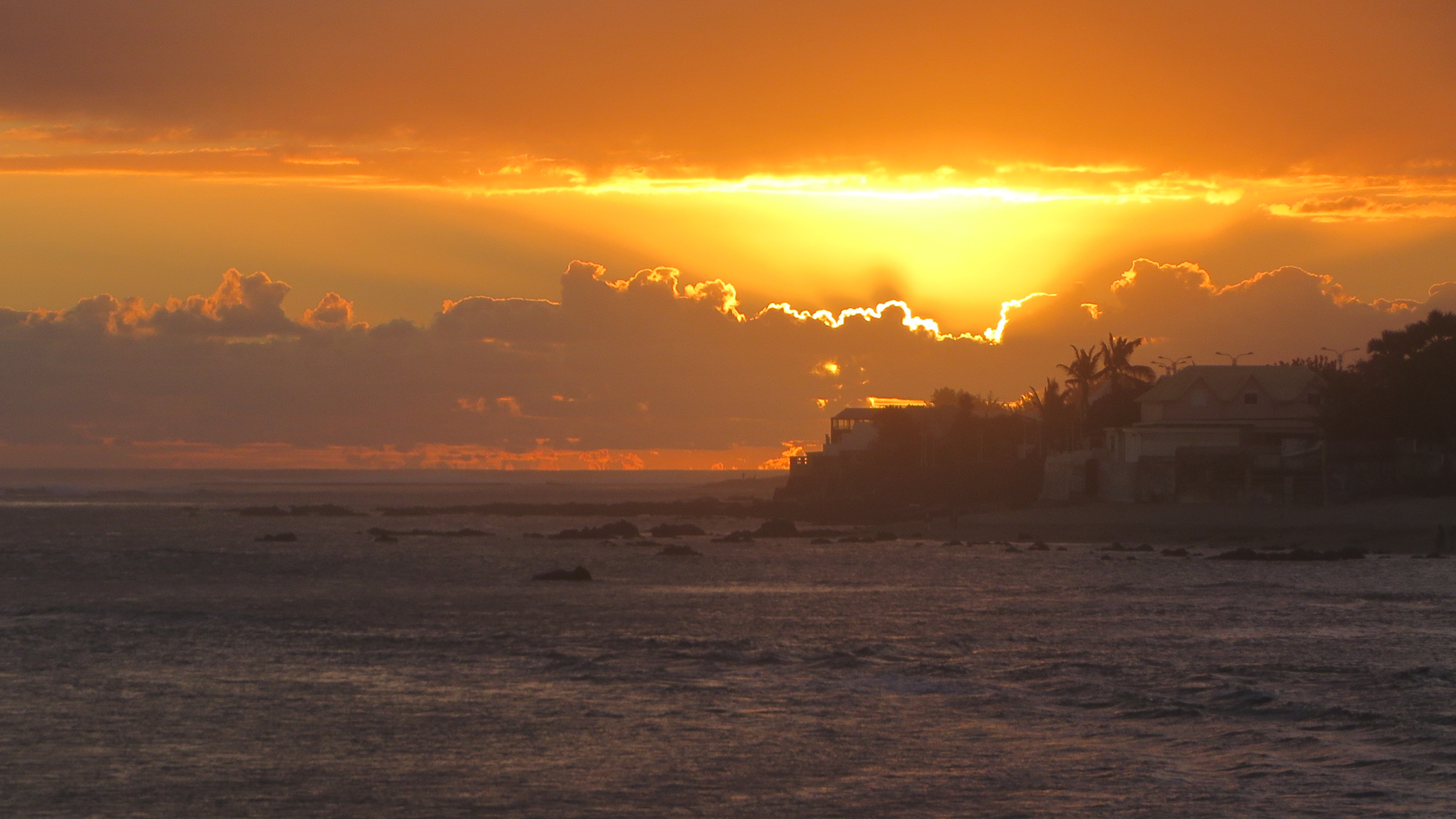
Sunset

== Twin towns-Sister cities ==
Saint-Pierre is twinned with Beau-Bassin Rose-Hill, Mauritius.

== See also ==
- Communes of the Réunion department

== Notable people ==
- Dimitri Payet
- Raphaël Babet
