= Saint-Joseph, Réunion =

Saint-Joseph
- Commune
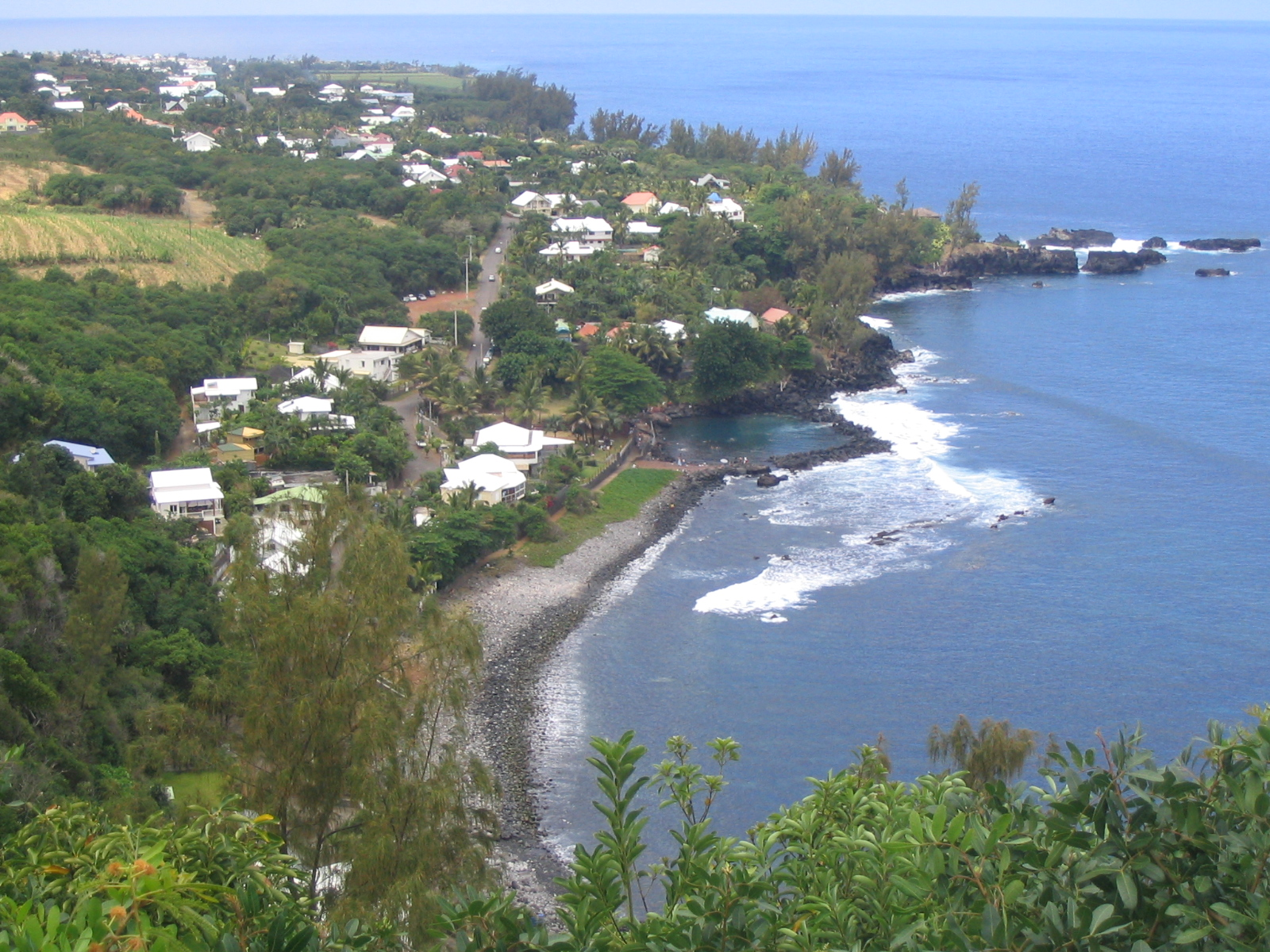
- Manapany in Saint-Joseph

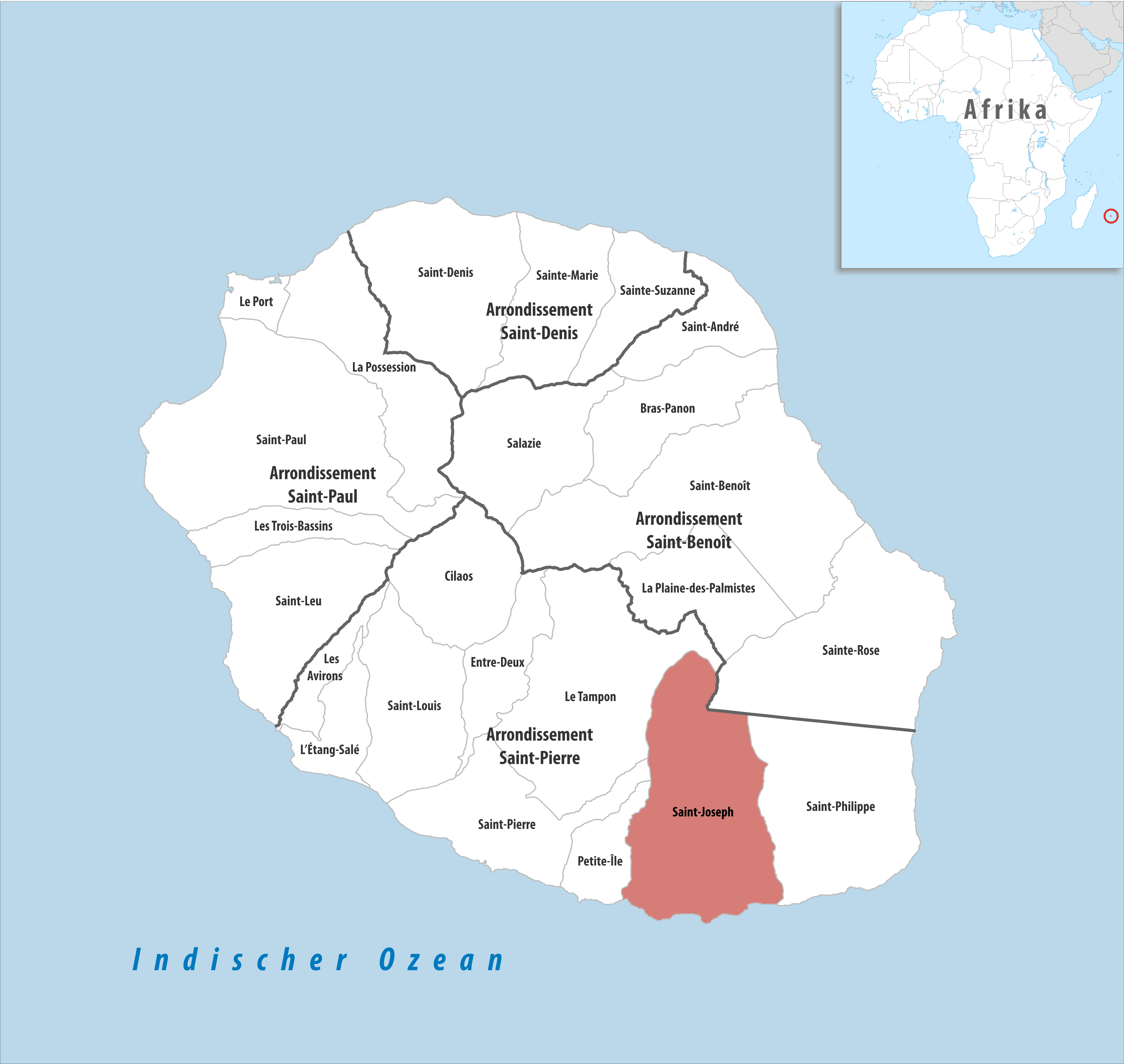
- Location of Saint-Joseph
- Coordinates: 21°22′43″S 55°37′09″E
- Country: France
- Overseas region and department: Réunion
- Arrondissement: Saint-Pierre
- Canton: Saint-Joseph and Saint-Pierre-3
- Intercommunality: CA du Sud

Government
  - Mayor (2020–2026): Patrick Lebreton
- Area^{1}: 178.50 km^{2} (68.92 sq mi)
- Elevation: 46 m (151 ft)
- Highest elevation: 2,448 m (8,031 ft)
- Lowest elevation: 0 m (0 ft)
- Population (2023): 39,207
  - Density: 219.65/km^{2} (568.88/sq mi)
- Time zone: UTC+04:00
- INSEE/Postal code: 97412 /97480
- ^{1} French Land Register data, which excludes lakes, ponds, glaciers > 1 km^{2} (0.386 sq mi or 247 acres) and river estuaries.

Saint-Joseph (French pronunciation: [sɛ̃ ʒozɛf]) is a commune in the French overseas department of Réunion. It is located on the extreme south end of the island of Réunion. As such, it features the southernmost point of the European Union. The village Vincendo is part of the commune.

== History ==
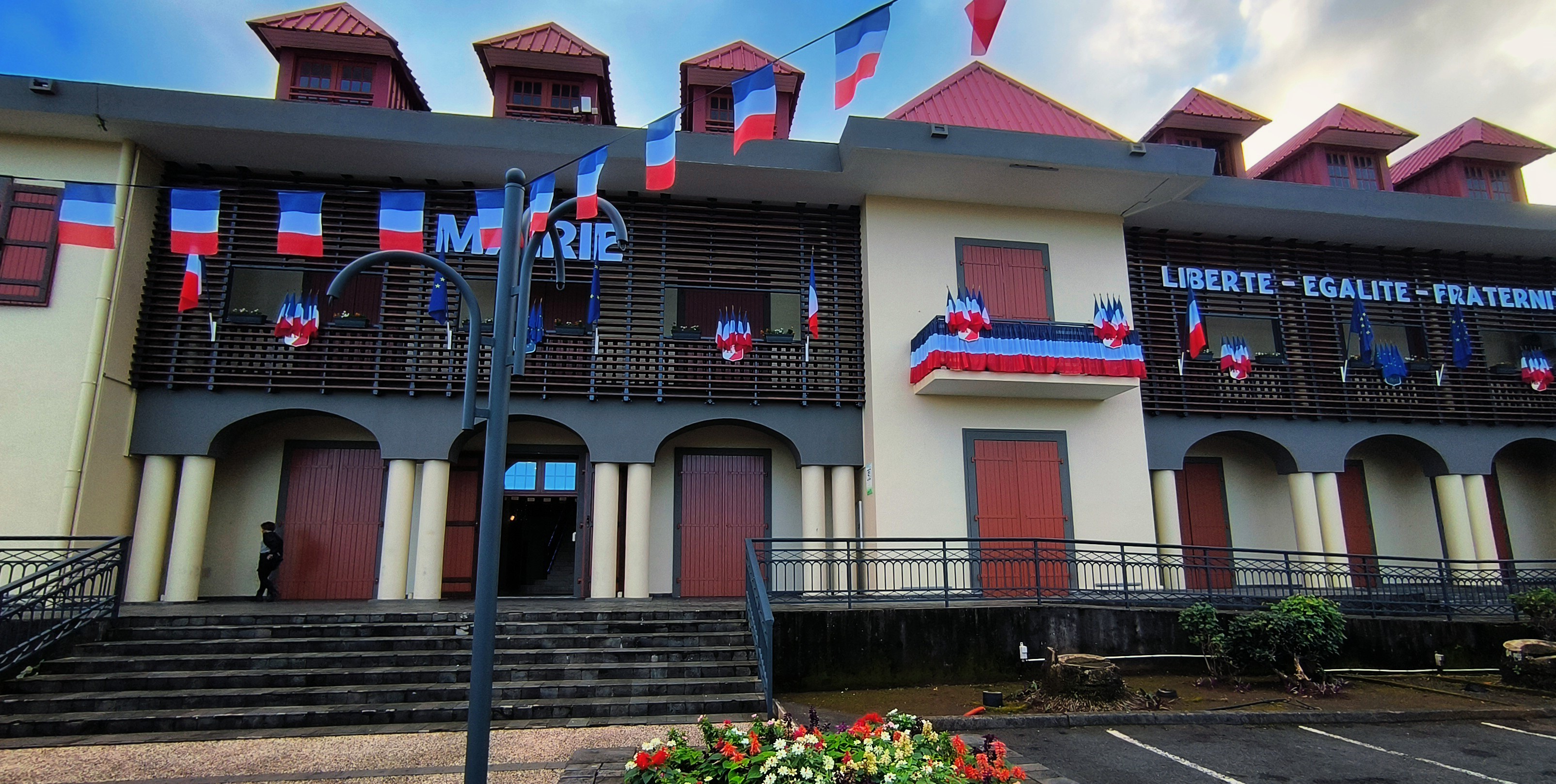
The Hôtel de Ville

The Hôtel de Ville was completed in 1953.

== Geography ==
=== Climate ===
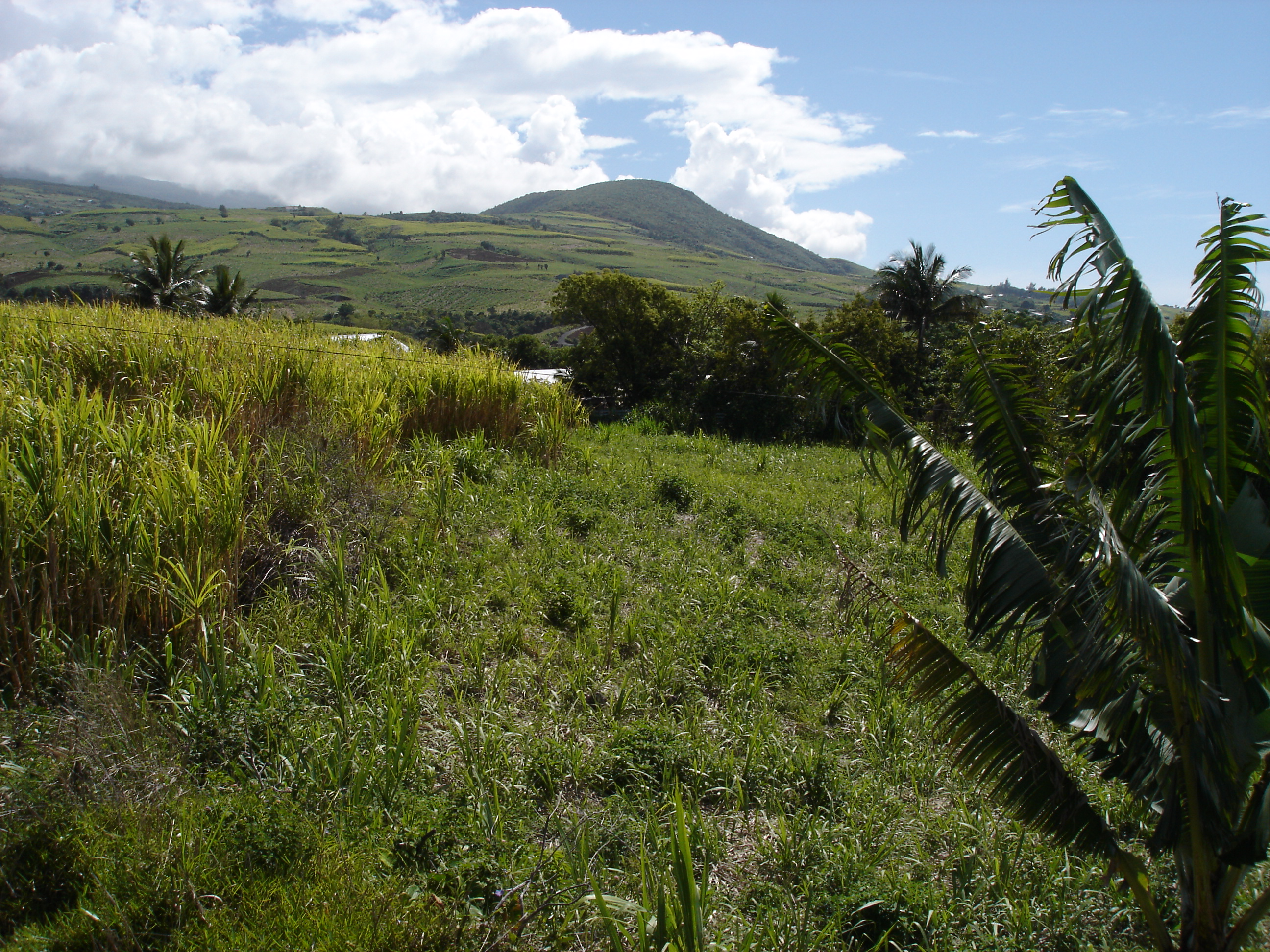
Scenery in Saint-Joseph

Saint-Joseph has a tropical monsoon climate (Köppen climate classification Am). The average annual temperature in Saint-Joseph is 24.4 °C (75.9 °F). The average annual rainfall is 1,661.2 mm (65.40 in) with February as the wettest month. The temperatures are highest on average in February, at around 27.4 °C (81.3 °F), and lowest in July, at around 21.3 °C (70.3 °F). The highest temperature ever recorded in Saint-Joseph was 35.5 °C (95.9 °F) on 1 March 1991; the coldest temperature ever recorded was 14.0 °C (57.2 °F) on 25 July 1996.

Climate data for Saint-Joseph (1991−2020 normals, extremes 1991−present)
Month	Jan	Feb	Mar	Apr	May	Jun	Jul	Aug	Sep	Oct	Nov	Dec	Year
Record high °C (°F)	35.5 (95.9)	34.6 (94.3)	35.5 (95.9)	33.3 (91.9)	31.9 (89.4)	30.1 (86.2)	30.5 (86.9)	28.6 (83.5)	29.6 (85.3)	31.5 (88.7)	33.0 (91.4)	33.6 (92.5)	35.5 (95.9)
Mean daily maximum °C (°F)	31.0 (87.8)	30.9 (87.6)	30.1 (86.2)	29.0 (84.2)	27.5 (81.5)	25.7 (78.3)	24.6 (76.3)	24.7 (76.5)	25.6 (78.1)	26.9 (80.4)	28.6 (83.5)	30.1 (86.2)	27.9 (82.2)
Daily mean °C (°F)	27.4 (81.3)	27.4 (81.3)	26.8 (80.2)	25.7 (78.3)	24.1 (75.4)	22.4 (72.3)	21.3 (70.3)	21.3 (70.3)	22.0 (71.6)	23.2 (73.8)	24.7 (76.5)	26.4 (79.5)	24.4 (75.9)
Mean daily minimum °C (°F)	23.8 (74.8)	24.0 (75.2)	23.4 (74.1)	22.4 (72.3)	20.8 (69.4)	19.1 (66.4)	18.1 (64.6)	18.0 (64.4)	18.5 (65.3)	19.5 (67.1)	20.9 (69.6)	22.6 (72.7)	20.9 (69.6)
Record low °C (°F)	18.0 (64.4)	20.9 (69.6)	19.5 (67.1)	18.9 (66.0)	16.3 (61.3)	15.7 (60.3)	14.0 (57.2)	14.8 (58.6)	15.1 (59.2)	14.5 (58.1)	16.4 (61.5)	19.6 (67.3)	14.0 (57.2)
Average precipitation mm (inches)	189.6 (7.46)	233.4 (9.19)	217.5 (8.56)	192.9 (7.59)	159.0 (6.26)	126.6 (4.98)	155.4 (6.12)	96.5 (3.80)	75.2 (2.96)	56.8 (2.24)	65.6 (2.58)	92.7 (3.65)	1,661.2 (65.40)
Average precipitation days (≥ 1.0 mm)	9.5	12.3	13.3	12.6	11.9	13.1	15.1	11.4	8.2	6.3	5.3	6.9	125.9
Source: Météo-France

== Population ==
Historical population
Year	Pop.	±% p.a.
1961	20,127	—
1967	22,361	+1.77%
1974	23,653	+0.81%
1982	23,307	−0.18%
1990	25,630	+1.19%
1999	30,293	+1.87%
2007	34,602	+1.68%
2012	37,069	+1.39%
2017	37,644	+0.31%
2023	39,207	+0.68%
Source: SPLAF and INSEE (1967–2023)

== See also ==
- Communes of the Réunion department
