= Departmental Council of Réunion =

Departmental legislature in France

Departmental Council of Réunion Conseil départemental de La Réunion
- Logo of the Council

Leadership
- President: Cyrille Melchior, LR

Structure
- Seats: 50

Meeting place
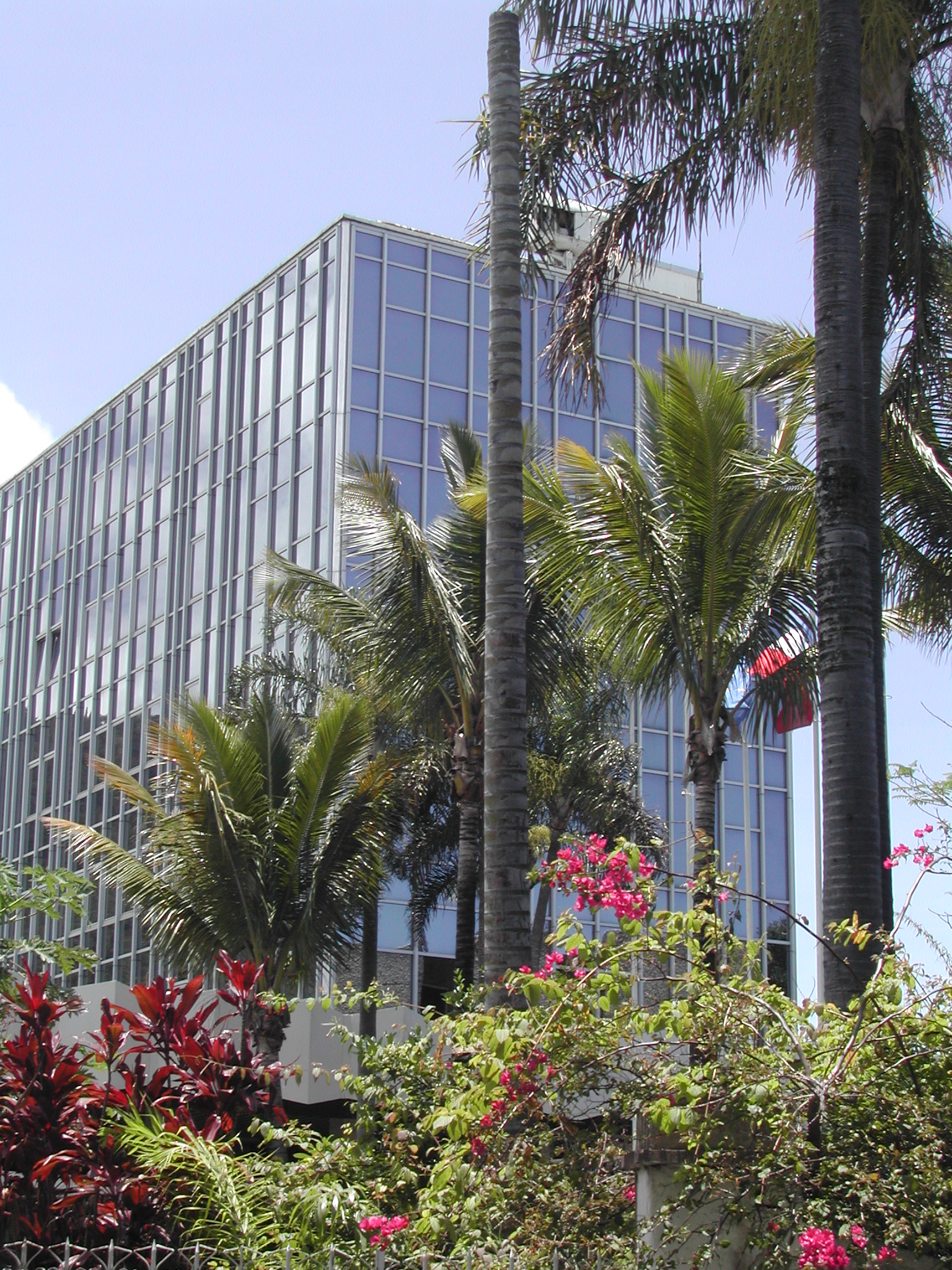
- The hôtel du département, commonly called the Palace of La Source (French: Palais de La Source.

Website
- www.departement974.fr

The Departmental Council of Réunion (French: Conseil départemental de La Réunion) is the deliberative assembly of the French overseas department of Réunion. It is made up of 50 departmental councillors, elected from the 25 cantons of Réunion.

The current president of the Réunion departmental council is Cyrille Melchior, who succeeded Nassimah Dindar (UDI) in December 2017, after her election to the Senate.

The departmental council sits at the Hôtel du département, nicknamed the Palais de la Source in Saint-Denis.

== Vice-presidents ==
List of vice-presidents of the Réunion Departmental Council (as of 2021)
Order	Name	Canton	Delegation
1st	Serge Hoareau	Saint-Pierre-3	Agricultural, European and institutional Affairs
2nd	Laurence Mondon	Le Tampon-1	Territorial development and ecological and solidarity transition
3rd	Jean-Marie Virapoullé	Saint-André-2	Coordination of social action and prevention and social inclusion strategy, territorial solidarity agreements, health prevention and reform of social assistance systems
4th	Béatrice Sigismeau	Saint-Pierre-2	Cultural Affairs and integration through the market economy, purchasing and public order
5th	Rémy Lagourgue	Sainte-Marie	Integration through the social and solidarity economy and innovative sectors
6th	Flora Augustine Etcheverry	Saint-Louis-1	Prevention of intra-family violence
7th	Bruno Domen	Saint-Leu	Tourism and rural development
8th	Sophie Arzal	Saint-Benoît-1	Development of youth, innovation and modernization of the action of the department
9th	Jeannick Atchapa	Saint-André-3	General Affairs, finance and housing
10th	Augustine Romano	Le Tampon-2	Maternal and child protection
11th	Eric Ferrère	L'Etang-Salé	Construction works and heritage
12th	Camille Clain	Saint-Louis-2	Environment and sustainable development
13th	Gilles Hubert	La Possession	Water management and hydraulic developments and citizen participation
14th	Thérèse Ferde	Saint-Pierre-1	Accompaniment of the elderly
15th	Philippe Potin	Saint-Pierre-2	Development of Sport and well-being
