= Solar eclipse of September 1, 2016 =

21st-century annular solar eclipse

- Annular eclipse
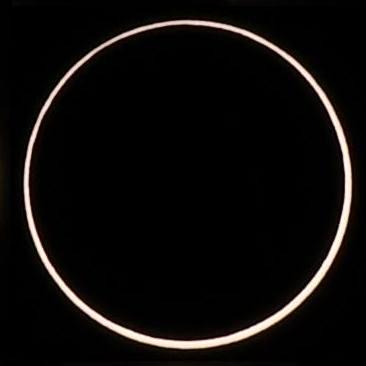
- From L'Étang-Salé, Réunion

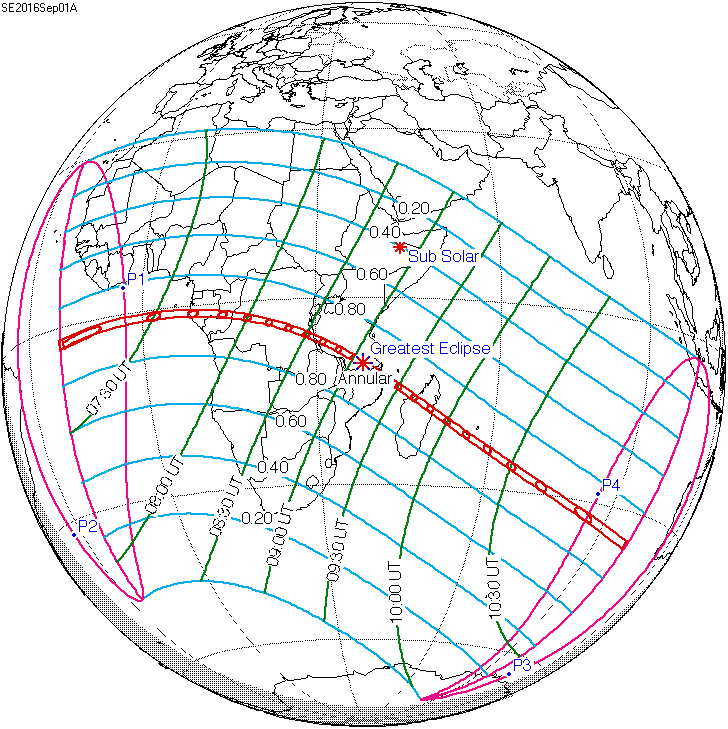
- Map
- Gamma: −0.333
- Magnitude: 0.9736

Maximum eclipse
- Duration: 186 s (3 min 6 s)
- Coordinates: 10.7°S 37.8°E
- Max. width of band: 100 km (62 mi)

Times (UTC)
- Greatest eclipse: 9:08:02

References
- Saros: 135 (39 of 71)
- Catalog # (SE5000): 9544

An annular solar eclipse occurred at the Moon's ascending node of orbit on Thursday, September 1, 2016, with a magnitude of 0.9736. A solar eclipse occurs when the Moon passes between Earth and the Sun, thereby totally or partly obscuring the image of the Sun for a viewer on Earth. An annular solar eclipse occurs when the Moon's apparent diameter is smaller than the Sun's, blocking most of the Sun's light and causing the Sun to look like an annulus (ring). An annular eclipse appears as a partial eclipse over a region of the Earth thousands of kilometres wide. Occurring about 5.4 days before apogee (on September 6, 2016, at 19:45 UTC), the Moon's apparent diameter was smaller.

Annularity was visible from parts of Gabon, Congo, Democratic Republic of the Congo, Tanzania, Mozambique, Madagascar, and Réunion. A partial eclipse was visible for most of Africa and parts of Antarctica.

== Images ==
Animated Path

== Eclipse timing ==
=== Places experiencing annular eclipse ===
Solar Eclipse of September 1, 2016 (Local Times)
Country or territory	City or place	Start of partial eclipse	Start of annular eclipse	Maximum eclipse	End of annular eclipse	End of partial eclipse	Duration of annularity (min:s)	Duration of eclipse (hr:min)	Maximum coverage
Gabon	Franceville	07:22:18	08:46:02	08:47:18	08:48:34	10:30:33	2:32	3:08	94.11%
Madagascar	Mahajanga	10:47:34	12:39:23	12:40:35	12:41:46	14:24:22	2:23	3:37	94.76%
Madagascar	Toamasina	11:00:56	12:50:44	12:52:10	12:53:37	14:31:56	2:53	3:31	94.62%
Réunion	Saint-Paul	12:22:32	14:08:10	14:09:14	14:10:19	15:42:15	2:09	3:20	94.34%
Réunion	Saint-Pierre	12:23:36	14:08:34	14:09:59	14:11:24	15:42:40	2:50	3:19	94.32%

=== Places experiencing partial eclipse ===
Solar Eclipse of September 1, 2016 (Local Times)
Country or territory	City or place	Start of partial eclipse	Maximum eclipse	End of partial eclipse	Duration of eclipse (hr:min)	Maximum coverage
Ivory Coast	Abidjan	06:13:11	07:20:50	08:40:30	2:31	71.55%
Ghana	Accra	06:13:27	07:23:38	08:46:54	2:33	71.47%
Togo	Lomé	06:13:47	07:24:38	08:48:52	2:35	69.50%
Benin	Porto-Novo	07:14:09	08:25:49	09:51:08	2:37	68.29%
Nigeria	Lagos	07:14:20	08:26:35	09:52:40	2:38	68.45%
São Tomé and Príncipe	São Tomé	06:16:29	07:34:21	09:08:43	2:52	90.50%
Equatorial Guinea	Malabo	07:16:31	08:34:45	10:09:11	2:53	77.96%
Gabon	Libreville	07:17:58	08:38:18	10:15:49	2:58	89.90%
Cameroon	Yaoundé	07:18:14	08:38:49	10:16:08	2:58	76.90%
Central African Republic	Bangui	07:24:32	08:51:16	10:34:51	3:10	71.87%
Republic of the Congo	Brazzaville	07:26:14	08:53:39	10:39:29	3:13	89.44%
Democratic Republic of the Congo	Kinshasa	07:26:19	08:53:47	10:39:39	3:13	89.26%
Angola	Luanda	07:30:02	08:55:08	10:37:58	3:08	73.01%
Rwanda	Kigali	08:45:32	10:28:03	12:22:29	3:37	82.07%
Burundi	Gitega	08:46:43	10:30:04	12:25:11	3:38	87.17%
Uganda	Kampala	09:49:07	11:31:43	13:24:10	3:35	70.81%
Zambia	Mpulungu	08:56:19	10:42:43	12:38:08	3:42	91.64%
Zambia	Kasama	08:58:58	10:45:32	12:40:28	3:42	87.23%
Kenya	Nairobi	10:00:27	11:46:58	13:38:41	3:38	69.11%
Tanzania	Dodoma	10:02:54	11:52:25	13:46:43	3:44	86.76%
Malawi	Lilongwe	09:11:44	11:00:14	12:52:40	3:41	79.93%
Tanzania	Dar es Salaam	10:12:57	12:04:34	13:56:37	3:44	82.28%
Mozambique	Nampula	09:27:08	11:19:08	13:08:35	3:41	86.39%
Mozambique	Pemba	09:26:12	11:19:18	13:09:11	3:43	94.82%
Comoros	Moroni	10:31:36	12:25:20	14:13:28	3:42	89.68%
Mayotte	Mamoudzou	10:39:14	12:32:55	14:18:52	3:40	89.11%
Madagascar	Antananarivo	10:57:00	12:48:16	14:29:14	3:32	90.52%
Réunion	Saint-Denis	12:22:51	14:09:30	15:42:25	3:20	94.27%
Mauritius	Port Louis	12:27:46	14:13:13	15:44:25	3:17	88.89%
French Southern and Antarctic Lands	Île Amsterdam	14:23:24	15:43:42	16:54:48	2:31	71.84%

== Gallery ==
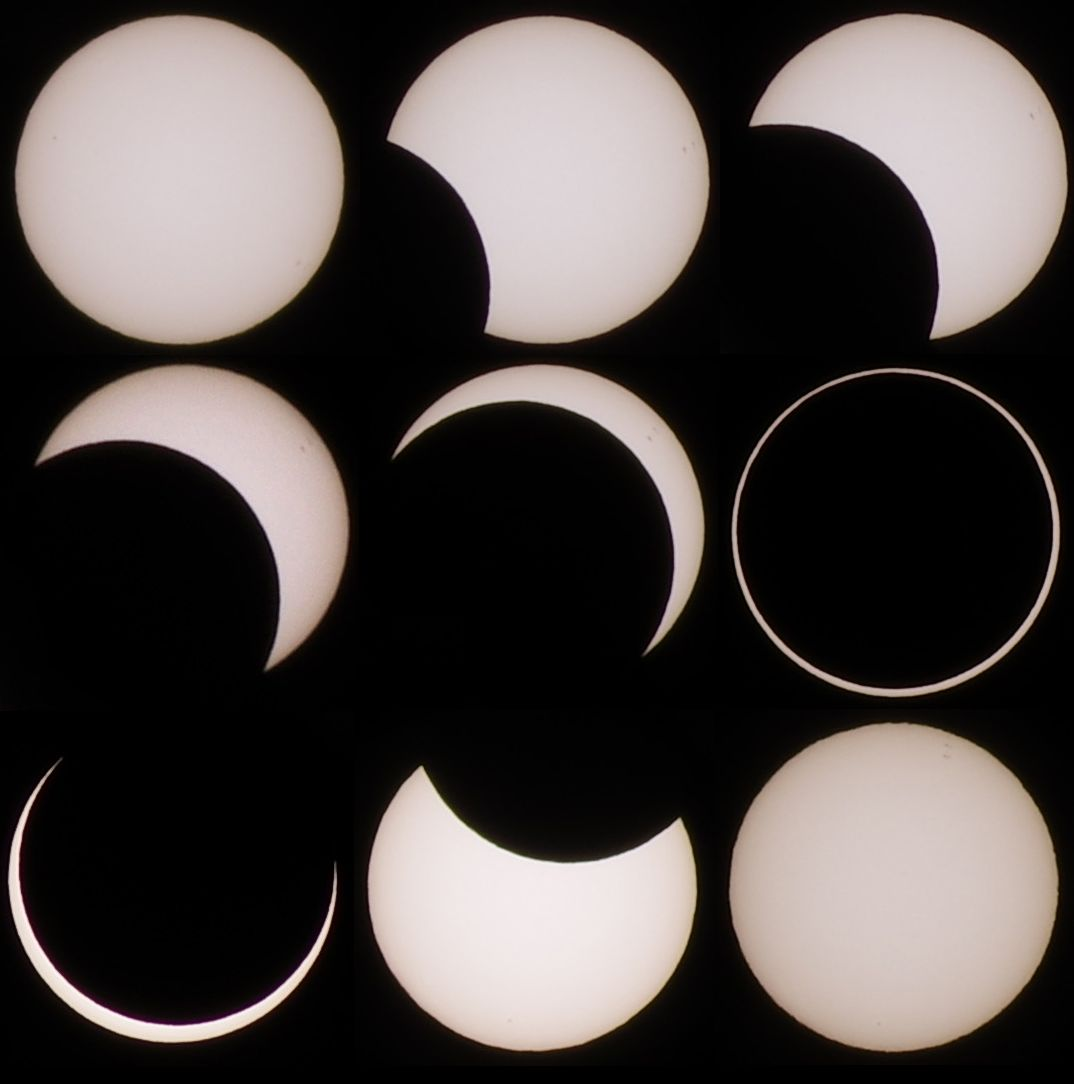
Composition images from L'Étang-Salé, Réunion

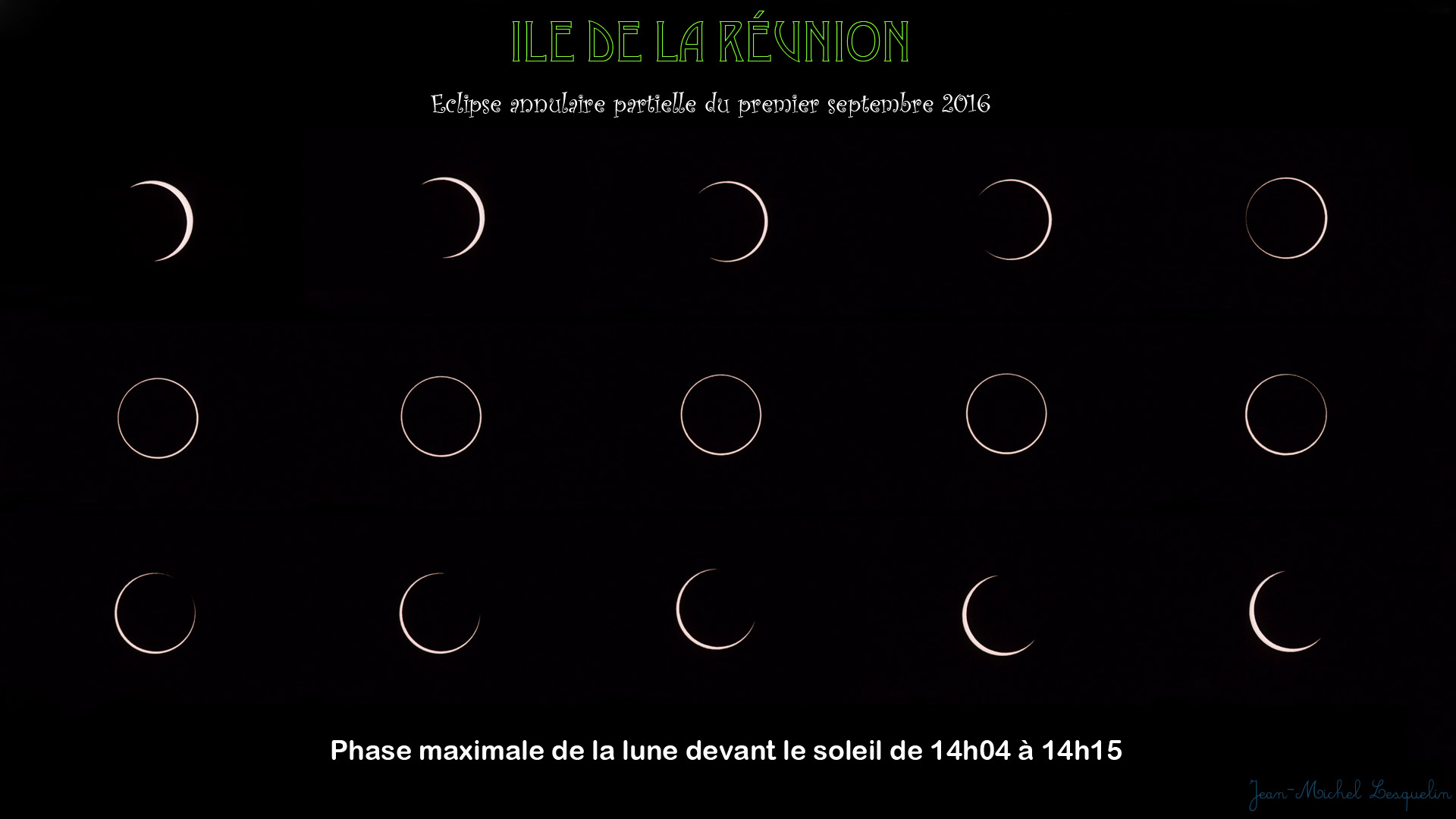
Annularity progression from Les Avirons, Réunion

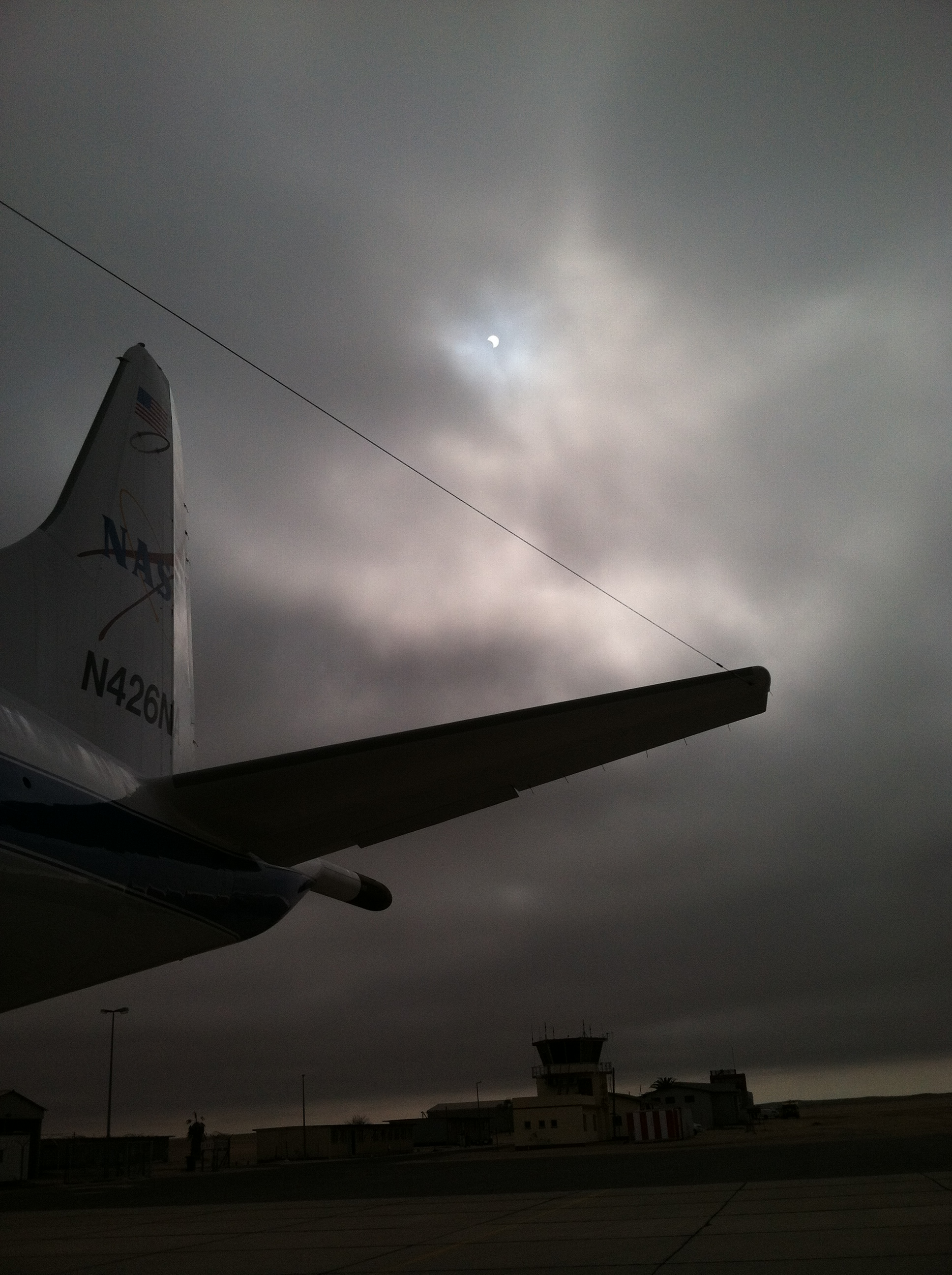
Partial from Walvis Bay, Namibia, 7:15 UTC

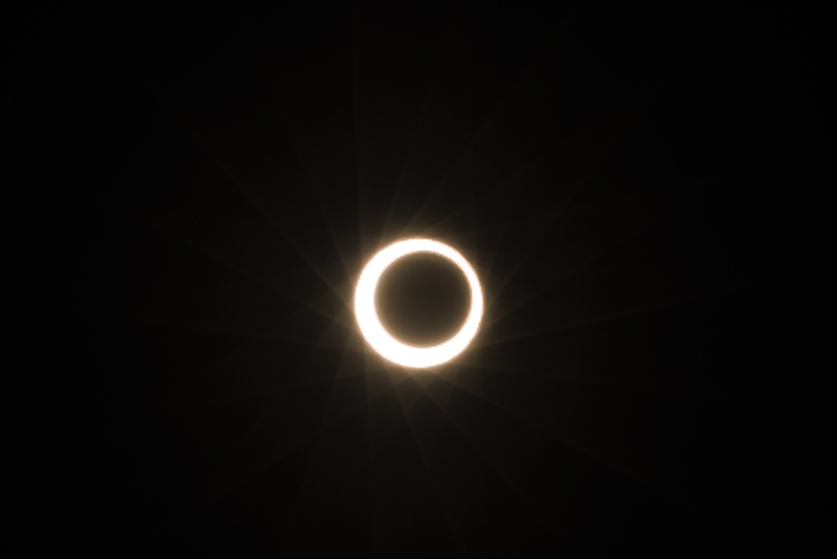
From Kalemie, DR Congo, 7:46 UTC

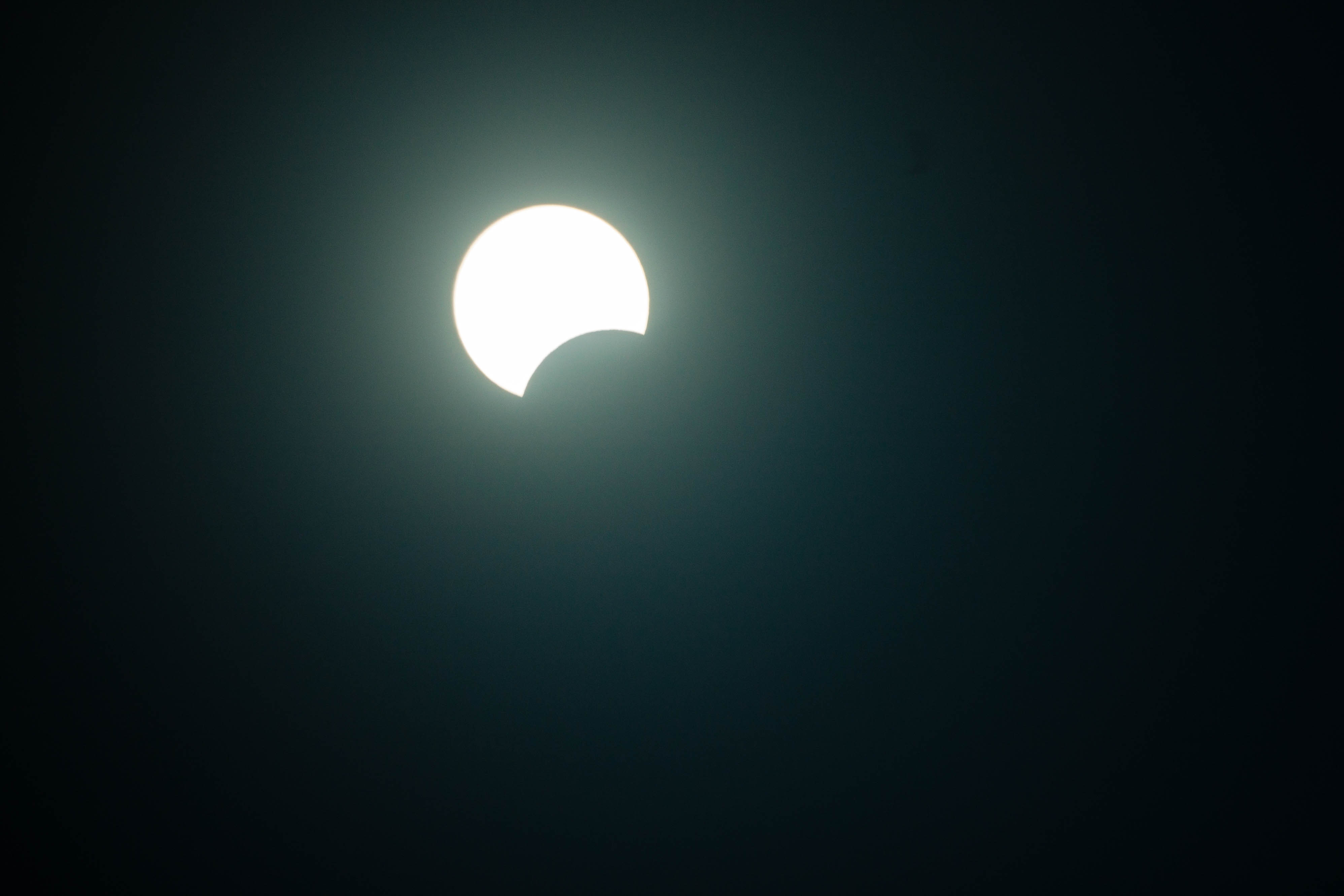
Partial from Port Elizabeth, South Africa, 9:35 UTC

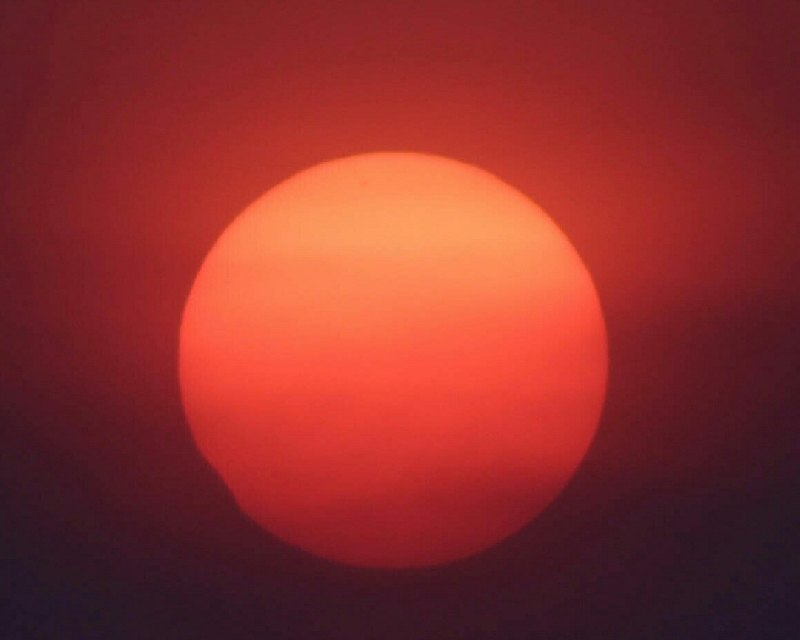
Partial from Jakarta, Indonesia, 10:33 UTC

== Eclipse details ==
Shown below are two tables displaying details about this particular solar eclipse. The first table outlines times at which the Moon's penumbra or umbra attains the specific parameter, and the second table describes various other parameters pertaining to this eclipse.

September 1, 2016 Solar Eclipse Times
Event	Time (UTC)
First Penumbral External Contact	2016 September 1 at 06:14:16.4 UTC
First Umbral External Contact	2016 September 1 at 07:18:57.7 UTC
First Central Line	2016 September 1 at 07:20:21.3 UTC
First Umbral Internal Contact	2016 September 1 at 07:21:45.1 UTC
First Penumbral Internal Contact	2016 September 1 at 08:34:59.5 UTC
Ecliptic Conjunction	2016 September 1 at 09:04:14.2 UTC
Greatest Duration	2016 September 1 at 09:06:18.1 UTC
Greatest Eclipse	2016 September 1 at 09:08:02.0 UTC
Equatorial Conjunction	2016 September 1 at 09:19:12.7 UTC
Last Penumbral Internal Contact	2016 September 1 at 09:40:44.7 UTC
Last Umbral Internal Contact	2016 September 1 at 10:54:08.6 UTC
Last Central Line	2016 September 1 at 10:55:35.3 UTC
Last Umbral External Contact	2016 September 1 at 10:57:01.8 UTC
Last Penumbral External Contact	2016 September 1 at 12:01:48.6 UTC

September 1, 2016 Solar Eclipse Parameters
Parameter	Value
Eclipse Magnitude	0.97362
Eclipse Obscuration	0.94794
Gamma	−0.33301
Sun Right Ascension	10h43m43.3s
Sun Declination	+08°03'38.0"
Sun Semi-Diameter	15'51.0"
Sun Equatorial Horizontal Parallax	08.7"
Moon Right Ascension	10h43m22.2s
Moon Declination	+07°45'51.0"
Moon Semi-Diameter	15'12.4"
Moon Equatorial Horizontal Parallax	0°55'48.6"
ΔT	68.3 s

== Eclipse season ==
This eclipse is part of an eclipse season, a period, roughly every six months, when eclipses occur. Only two (or occasionally three) eclipse seasons occur each year, and each season lasts about 35 days and repeats just short of six months (173 days) later; thus two full eclipse seasons always occur each year. Either two or three eclipses happen each eclipse season. In the sequence below, each eclipse is separated by a fortnight. The first and last eclipse in this sequence is separated by one synodic month.

Eclipse season of August–September 2016
August 18 Descending node (full moon)	September 1 Ascending node (new moon)	September 16 Descending node (full moon)
Penumbral lunar eclipse Lunar Saros 109	Annular solar eclipse Solar Saros 135	Penumbral lunar eclipse Lunar Saros 147

== Related eclipses ==
=== Eclipses in 2016 ===
- A total solar eclipse on March 9.
- A penumbral lunar eclipse on March 23.
- A penumbral lunar eclipse on August 18.
- An annular solar eclipse on September 1.
- A penumbral lunar eclipse on September 16.

=== Metonic ===
- Preceded by: Solar eclipse of November 13, 2012
- Followed by: Solar eclipse of June 21, 2020

=== Tzolkinex ===
- Preceded by: Solar eclipse of July 22, 2009
- Followed by: Solar eclipse of October 14, 2023

=== Half-Saros ===
- Preceded by: Lunar eclipse of August 28, 2007
- Followed by: Lunar eclipse of September 7, 2025

=== Tritos ===
- Preceded by: Solar eclipse of October 3, 2005
- Followed by: Solar eclipse of August 2, 2027

=== Solar Saros 135 ===
- Preceded by: Solar eclipse of August 22, 1998
- Followed by: Solar eclipse of September 12, 2034

=== Inex ===
- Preceded by: Solar eclipse of September 23, 1987
- Followed by: Solar eclipse of August 12, 2045

=== Triad ===
- Preceded by: Solar eclipse of November 1, 1929
- Followed by: Solar eclipse of July 4, 2103

=== Solar eclipses of 2015–2018 ===
This eclipse is a member of a semester series. An eclipse in a semester series of solar eclipses repeats approximately every 177 days and 4 hours (a semester) at alternating nodes of the Moon's orbit.

The partial solar eclipse on July 13, 2018 occurs in the next lunar year eclipse set.

Solar eclipse series sets from 2015 to 2018
Descending node			Ascending node		
Saros	Map	Gamma	Saros	Map	Gamma
120 Totality in Longyearbyen, Svalbard	March 20, 2015 Total	0.94536	125 Solar Dynamics Observatory	September 13, 2015 Partial	−1.10039
130 Balikpapan, Indonesia	March 9, 2016 Total	0.26092	135 Annularity in L'Étang-Salé, Réunion	September 1, 2016 Annular	−0.33301
140 Partial from Buenos Aires, Argentina	February 26, 2017 Annular	−0.45780	145 Totality in Madras, OR, USA	August 21, 2017 Total	0.43671
150 Partial in Olivos, Buenos Aires, Argentina	February 15, 2018 Partial	−1.21163	155 Partial in Huittinen, Finland	August 11, 2018 Partial	1.14758

=== Saros 135 ===
This eclipse is a part of Saros series 135, repeating every 18 years, 11 days, and containing 71 events. The series started with a partial solar eclipse on July 5, 1331. It contains annular eclipses from October 21, 1511 through February 24, 2305; hybrid eclipses on March 8, 2323 and March 18, 2341; and total eclipses from March 29, 2359 through May 22, 2449. The series ends at member 71 as a partial eclipse on August 17, 2593. Its eclipses are tabulated in three columns; every third eclipse in the same column is one exeligmos apart, so they all cast shadows over approximately the same parts of the Earth.

The longest duration of annularity was produced by member 16 at 10 minutes, 41 seconds on December 24, 1601, and the longest duration of totality will be produced by member 62 at 2 minutes, 27 seconds on May 12, 2431. All eclipses in this series occur at the Moon’s ascending node of orbit.

Series members 28–49 occur between 1801 and 2200:
28	29	30
May 5, 1818	May 15, 1836	May 26, 1854
31	32	33
June 6, 1872	June 17, 1890	June 28, 1908
34	35	36
July 9, 1926	July 20, 1944	July 31, 1962
37	38	39
August 10, 1980	August 22, 1998	September 1, 2016
40	42	42
September 12, 2034	September 22, 2052	October 4, 2070
43	44	45
October 14, 2088	October 26, 2106	November 6, 2124
46	47	48
November 17, 2142	November 27, 2160	December 9, 2178
49
December 19, 2196

=== Metonic series ===
The metonic series repeats eclipses every 19 years (6939.69 days), lasting about 5 cycles. Eclipses occur in nearly the same calendar date. In addition, the octon subseries repeats 1/5 of that or every 3.8 years (1387.94 days). All eclipses in this table occur at the Moon's ascending node.

21 eclipse events between June 21, 1982 and June 21, 2058
June 21	April 8–9	January 26	November 13–14	September 1–2
117	119	121	123	125
June 21, 1982	April 9, 1986	January 26, 1990	November 13, 1993	September 2, 1997
127	129	131	133	135
June 21, 2001	April 8, 2005	January 26, 2009	November 13, 2012	September 1, 2016
137	139	141	143	145
June 21, 2020	April 8, 2024	January 26, 2028	November 14, 2031	September 2, 2035
147	149	151	153	155
June 21, 2039	April 9, 2043	January 26, 2047	November 14, 2050	September 2, 2054
157
June 21, 2058

=== Tritos series ===
This eclipse is a part of a tritos cycle, repeating at alternating nodes every 135 synodic months (≈ 3986.63 days, or 11 years minus 1 month). Their appearance and longitude are irregular due to a lack of synchronization with the anomalistic month (period of perigee), but groupings of 3 tritos cycles (≈ 33 years minus 3 months) come close (≈ 434.044 anomalistic months), so eclipses are similar in these groupings.

Series members between 1801 and 2200
April 14, 1809 (Saros 116)	March 14, 1820 (Saros 117)	February 12, 1831 (Saros 118)	January 11, 1842 (Saros 119)	December 11, 1852 (Saros 120)
November 11, 1863 (Saros 121)	October 10, 1874 (Saros 122)	September 8, 1885 (Saros 123)	August 9, 1896 (Saros 124)	July 10, 1907 (Saros 125)
June 8, 1918 (Saros 126)	May 9, 1929 (Saros 127)	April 7, 1940 (Saros 128)	March 7, 1951 (Saros 129)	February 5, 1962 (Saros 130)
January 4, 1973 (Saros 131)	December 4, 1983 (Saros 132)	November 3, 1994 (Saros 133)	October 3, 2005 (Saros 134)	September 1, 2016 (Saros 135)
August 2, 2027 (Saros 136)	July 2, 2038 (Saros 137)	May 31, 2049 (Saros 138)	April 30, 2060 (Saros 139)	March 31, 2071 (Saros 140)
February 27, 2082 (Saros 141)	January 27, 2093 (Saros 142)	December 29, 2103 (Saros 143)	November 27, 2114 (Saros 144)	October 26, 2125 (Saros 145)
September 26, 2136 (Saros 146)	August 26, 2147 (Saros 147)	July 25, 2158 (Saros 148)	June 25, 2169 (Saros 149)	May 24, 2180 (Saros 150)
April 23, 2191 (Saros 151)

=== Inex series ===
This eclipse is a part of the long period inex cycle, repeating at alternating nodes, every 358 synodic months (≈ 10,571.95 days, or 29 years minus 20 days). Their appearance and longitude are irregular due to a lack of synchronization with the anomalistic month (period of perigee). However, groupings of 3 inex cycles (≈ 87 years minus 2 months) comes close (≈ 1,151.02 anomalistic months), so eclipses are similar in these groupings.

Series members between 1801 and 2200
January 21, 1814 (Saros 128)	December 31, 1842 (Saros 129)	December 12, 1871 (Saros 130)
November 22, 1900 (Saros 131)	November 1, 1929 (Saros 132)	October 12, 1958 (Saros 133)
September 23, 1987 (Saros 134)	September 1, 2016 (Saros 135)	August 12, 2045 (Saros 136)
July 24, 2074 (Saros 137)	July 4, 2103 (Saros 138)	June 13, 2132 (Saros 139)
May 25, 2161 (Saros 140)	May 4, 2190 (Saros 141)	
