= Communes of the Réunion department =

The following is a list of the 24 communes of the Réunion (an overseas department of France), along with the arrondissement (district) in which they are located, and the intercommunality of which they are a member.

INSEE code	Postal code	Commune name	Year of creation	Arrondissement	Intercommunality
97401	97425	Les Avirons	1894	Saint-Pierre	CIVIS
97402	97412	Bras-Panon	1882	Saint-Benoît	CIREST
97424	97413	Cilaos	1965	Saint-Pierre	CIVIS
97403	97414	Entre-Deux	1882	Saint-Pierre	CASUD
97404	97427	L'Étang-Salé	1894	Saint-Pierre	CIVIS
97405	97429	Petite-Île	1935	Saint-Pierre	CIVIS
97406	97431	La Plaine-des-Palmistes	1899	Saint-Benoît	CIREST
97407	97420	Le Port	1895	Saint-Paul	TCO
97408	97419	La Possession	1890	Saint-Paul	TCO
97409	97440	Saint-André	1741	Saint-Benoît	CIREST
97410	97470	Saint-Benoît	1733	Saint-Benoît ^{(capital)}	CIREST ^{(seat)}
97411	97400	Saint-Denis	1689	Saint-Denis ^{(capital)}	CINOR ^{(seat)}
97418	97438	Sainte-Marie	1737	Saint-Denis	CINOR
97419	97439	Sainte-Rose	1790	Saint-Benoît	CIREST
97420	97441	Sainte-Suzanne	1704	Saint-Denis	CINOR
97412	97480	Saint-Joseph	1875	Saint-Pierre	CASUD
97413	97416	Saint-Leu	1790	Saint-Paul	TCO
97414	97421	Saint-Louis	1768	Saint-Pierre	CIVIS
97415	97428	Saint-Paul	1663	Saint-Paul ^{(capital)}	TCO ^{(seat)}
97417	97442	Saint-Philippe	1830	Saint-Pierre	CASUD
97416	97410	Saint-Pierre	1735	Saint-Pierre ^{(capital)}	CIVIS ^{(seat)}
97421	97433	Salazie	1899	Saint-Benoît	CIREST
97422	97418	Le Tampon	1925	Saint-Pierre	CASUD ^{(seat)}
97423	97426	Les Trois-Bassins	1897	Saint-Paul	TCO

Intercommunalities:

- CASUD: Communauté d'agglomération du Sud, created in 2010.
- CINOR: Communauté intercommunale du Nord de La Réunion, created in 2001.
- CIREST: Communauté intercommunale Réunion Est, created in 2002.
- CIVIS: Communauté intercommunale des Villes solidaires, created in 2003.
- TCO: Territoire de la Côte Ouest, created in 2002.

== See also ==
- List of cities in East Africa
