= 1988 Réunionese General Council election =

General Council elections were held in Réunion in September and October 1988. Right-wing independents emerged as the largest bloc in the Council, winning 19 seats.

== Results ==
Party	Seats
Right-wing independents	19
Communist Party of Réunion	9
Union for French Democracy	6
Rally for the Republic	4
Socialist Party	4
Left-wing independents	2
Total	44
Source: Europa World Year Book

== Aftermath ==
Following the elections, right-wing independent Eric Boyer was elected President of the Council.
