= Solar eclipse of February 15, 2018 =

21st-century partial solar eclipse

- Partial eclipse
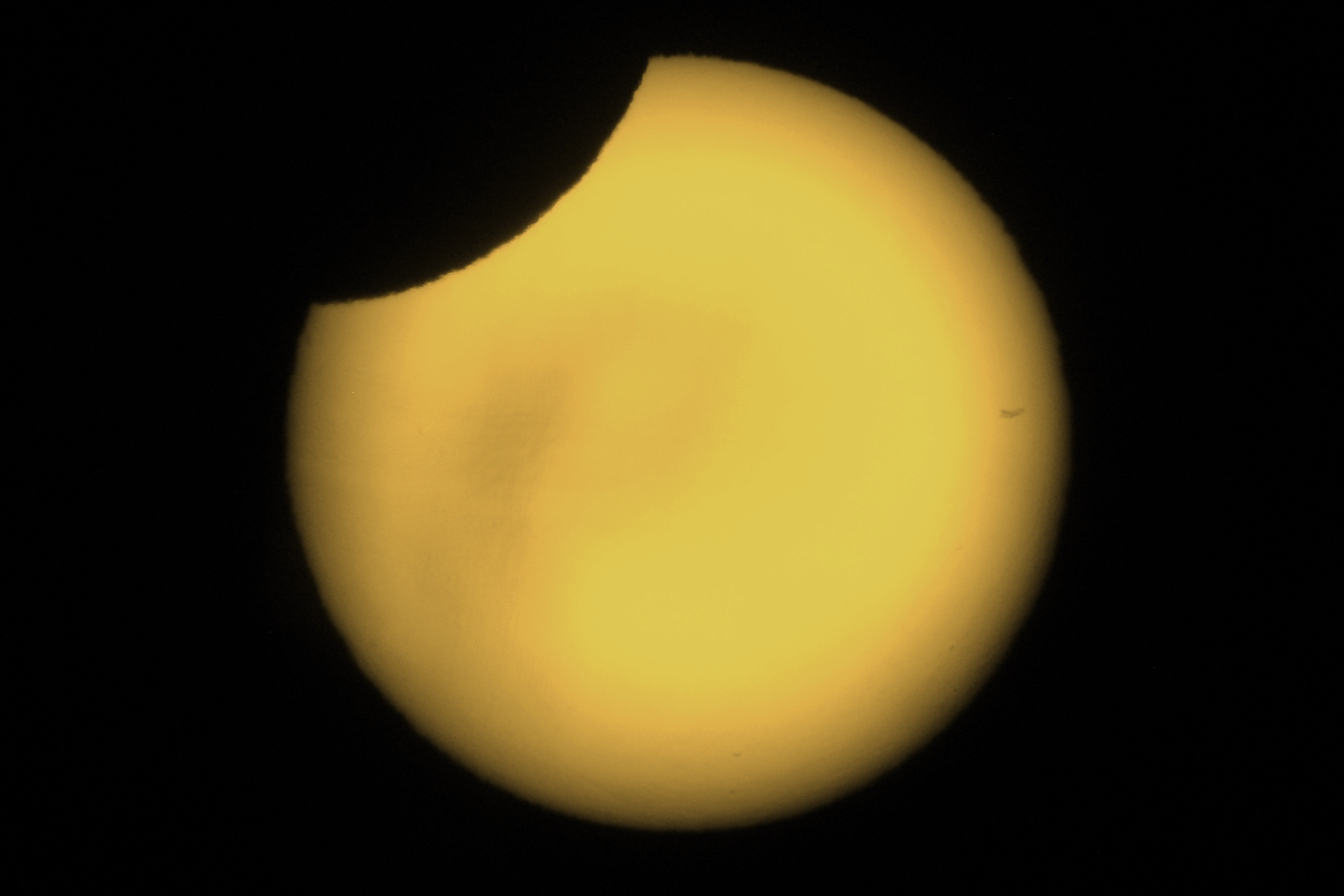
- From Olivos, Buenos Aires, Argentina

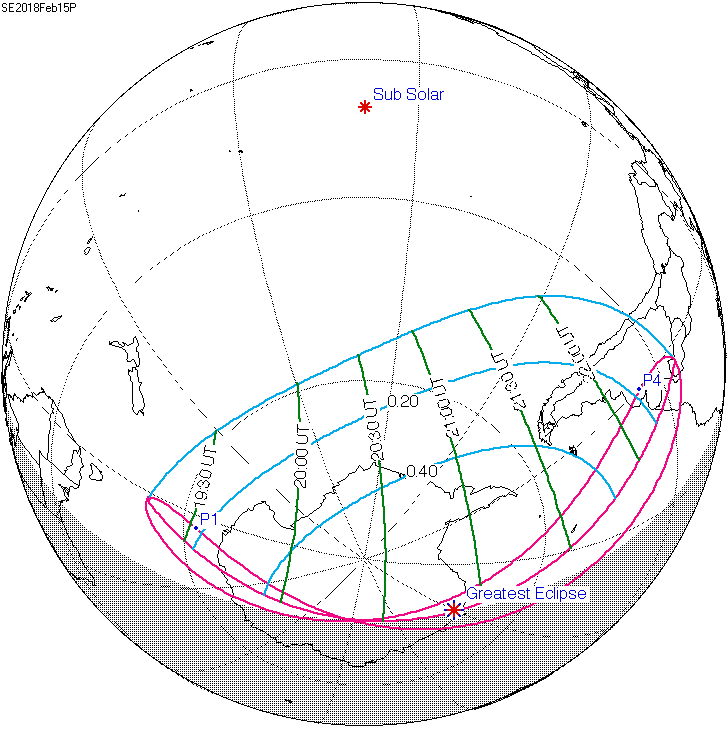
- Map
- Gamma: −1.2116
- Magnitude: 0.5991

Maximum eclipse
- Coordinates: 71°S 0.6°E

Times (UTC)
- Greatest eclipse: 20:52:33

References
- Saros: 150 (17 of 71)
- Catalog # (SE5000): 9547

A partial solar eclipse occurred at the Moon's descending node of orbit on Thursday, February 15, 2018, with a magnitude of 0.5991. A solar eclipse occurs when the Moon passes between Earth and the Sun, thereby totally or partly obscuring the image of the Sun for a viewer on Earth. A partial solar eclipse occurs in the polar regions of the Earth when the center of the Moon's shadow misses the Earth.

A partial eclipse was visible for parts of Antarctica and southern South America.

== Images ==
Animated path

== Gallery ==
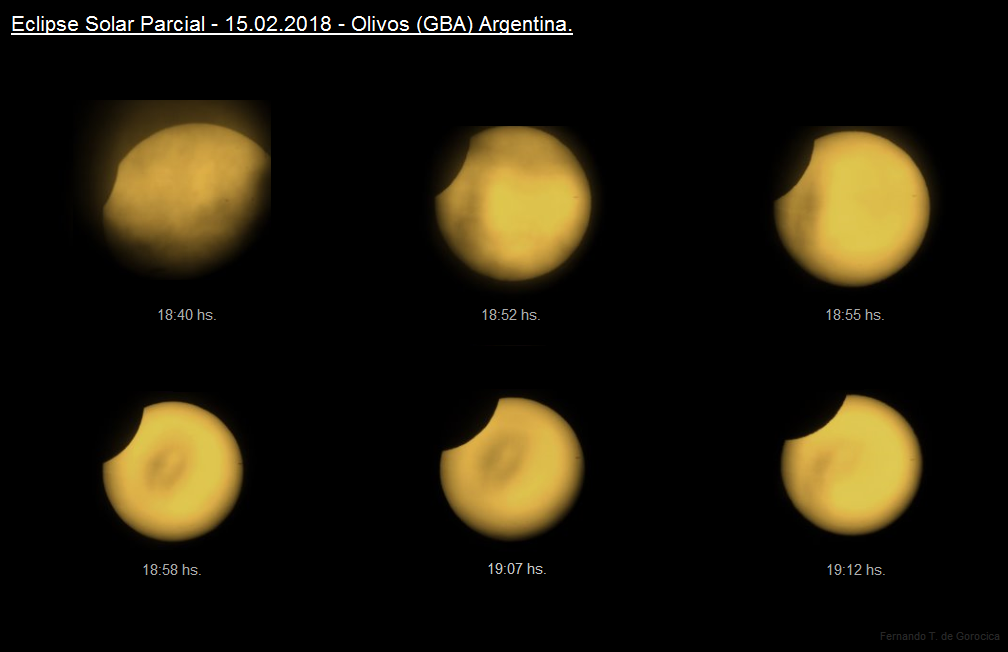
Time lapse images as viewed from Olivos, Buenos Aires, Argentina

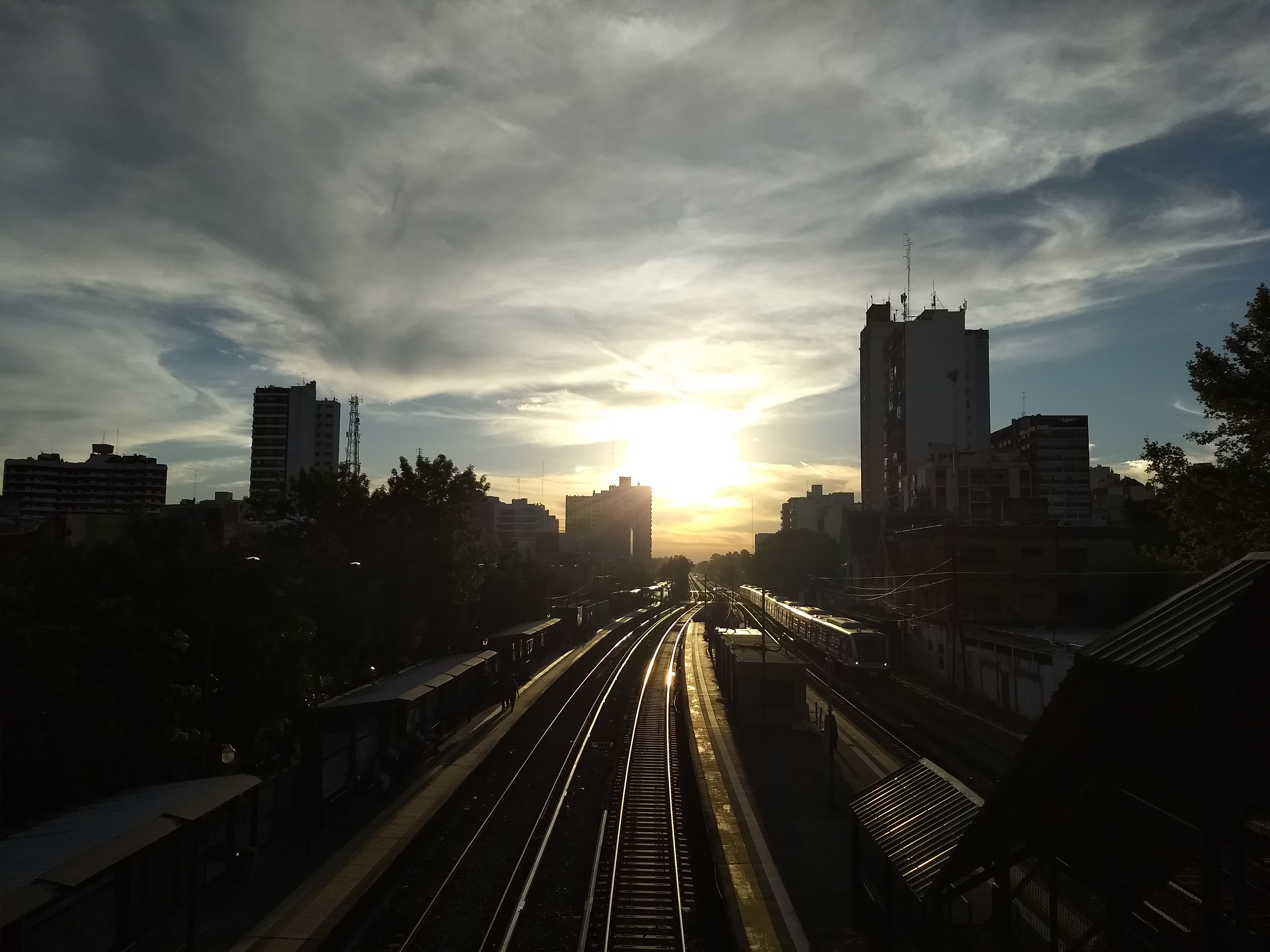
From Ramos Mejía, Argentina, 22:13 UTC

== Eclipse timing ==
=== Places experiencing partial eclipse ===
Solar Eclipse of February 15, 2018 (Local Times)
Country or territory	City or place	Start of partial eclipse	Maximum eclipse	End of partial eclipse	Duration of eclipse (hr:min)	Maximum coverage
Antarctica	Troll	19:53:33	20:49:28	21:11:08 (sunset)	1:18	49.09%
Antarctica	Marambio Base	17:15:47	18:16:37	19:14:15	1:58	37.98%
Antarctica	Esperanza Base	17:17:42	18:18:22	19:15:46	1:58	37.38%
Antarctica	Carlini Base	17:20:09	18:20:41	19:17:49	1:58	36.04%
Antarctica	Orcadas Base	17:24:53	18:23:21	19:18:41	1:54	39.94%
South Georgia and the South Sandwich Islands	King Edward Point	18:38:36	19:33:13	19:57:49 (sunset)	1:19	37.40%
Chile	Punta Arenas	17:40:59	18:37:49	19:30:47	1:50	22.90%
Falkland Islands	Stanley	17:46:42	18:42:18	19:34:14	1:48	27.69%
Brazil	Criciúma	19:51:17	20:00:40	20:03:14 (sunset)	0:12	1.53%
Brazil	Porto Alegre	19:47:45	20:06:23	20:12:18 (sunset)	0:25	3.68%
Argentina	Neuquén	18:25:37	19:06:38	19:45:07	1:20	8.94%
Argentina	Mar del Plata	18:25:06	19:07:07	19:46:36	1:23	12.10%
Uruguay	Montevideo	18:34:19	19:11:42	19:38:29 (sunset)	1:04	8.83%
Argentina	La Plata	18:35:10	19:12:11	19:45:33 (sunset)	1:10	8.26%
Uruguay	Canelones	18:35:36	19:12:19	19:38:19 (sunset)	1:03	8.35%
Argentina	Buenos Aires	18:36:27	19:12:47	19:46:50 (sunset)	1:10	7.76%
Uruguay	Durazno	18:39:36	19:14:08	19:37:44 (sunset)	0:58	6.93%
Brazil	Rio Grande	19:41:24	20:14:26	20:18:18 (sunset)	0:37	6.64%
Brazil	Pelotas	19:42:27	20:14:54	20:18:55 (sunset)	0:36	6.27%
Uruguay	Fray Bentos	18:41:37	19:15:05	19:44:33 (sunset)	1:03	6.09%
Argentina	Rosario	18:43:43	19:15:57	19:46:35	1:03	5.18%
Uruguay	Paysandú	18:44:22	19:16:13	19:42:37 (sunset)	0:58	5.28%
Chile	Santiago	18:49:25	19:16:26	19:42:15	0:53	2.45%
Uruguay	Tacuarembó	18:45:09	19:16:25	19:33:24 (sunset)	0:48	5.23%
Argentina	Mendoza	18:50:20	19:17:18	19:43:06	0:53	2.54%
Uruguay	Rivera	18:47:52	19:17:26	19:30:36 (sunset)	0:43	4.47%
Uruguay	Salto	18:47:49	19:17:34	19:40:54 (sunset)	0:53	4.34%
Paraguay	Ciudad del Este	19:13:34	19:18:02	19:20:31 (sunset)	0:07	0.12%
Argentina	Córdoba	18:52:50	19:19:08	19:44:19	0:51	2.63%
Paraguay	Encarnación	19:03:45	19:22:28	19:27:36 (sunset)	0:24	1.14%

== Eclipse details ==
Shown below are two tables displaying details about this particular solar eclipse. The first table outlines times at which the Moon's penumbra or umbra attains the specific parameter, and the second table describes various other parameters pertaining to this eclipse.

February 15, 2018 Solar Eclipse Times
Event	Time (UTC)
First Penumbral External Contact	2018 February 15 at 18:56:59.4 UTC
Equatorial Conjunction	2018 February 15 at 20:16:17.1 UTC
Greatest Eclipse	2018 February 15 at 20:52:33.3 UTC
Ecliptic Conjunction	2018 February 15 at 21:06:21.5 UTC
Last Penumbral External Contact	2018 February 15 at 22:48:19.3 UTC

February 15, 2018 Solar Eclipse Parameters
Parameter	Value
Eclipse Magnitude	0.59911
Eclipse Obscuration	0.49084
Gamma	−1.21163
Sun Right Ascension	21h57m18.8s
Sun Declination	-12°28'07.3"
Sun Semi-Diameter	16'11.4"
Sun Equatorial Horizontal Parallax	08.9"
Moon Right Ascension	21h58m26.9s
Moon Declination	-13°32'29.9"
Moon Semi-Diameter	14'59.4"
Moon Equatorial Horizontal Parallax	0°55'00.9"
ΔT	69.0 s

== Eclipse season ==
This eclipse is part of an eclipse season, a period, roughly every six months, when eclipses occur. Only two (or occasionally three) eclipse seasons occur each year, and each season lasts about 35 days and repeats just short of six months (173 days) later; thus two full eclipse seasons always occur each year. Either two or three eclipses happen each eclipse season. In the sequence below, each eclipse is separated by a fortnight.

Eclipse season of January–February 2018
January 31 Ascending node (full moon)	February 15 Descending node (new moon)
Total lunar eclipse Lunar Saros 124	Partial solar eclipse Solar Saros 150

== Related eclipses ==
=== Eclipses in 2018 ===
- A total lunar eclipse on January 31.
- A partial solar eclipse on February 15.
- A partial solar eclipse on July 13.
- A total lunar eclipse on July 27.
- A partial solar eclipse on August 11.

=== Metonic ===
- Preceded by: Solar eclipse of April 29, 2014
- Followed by: Solar eclipse of December 4, 2021

=== Tzolkinex ===
- Preceded by: Solar eclipse of January 4, 2011
- Followed by: Solar eclipse of March 29, 2025

=== Half-Saros ===
- Preceded by: Lunar eclipse of February 9, 2009
- Followed by: Lunar eclipse of February 20, 2027

=== Tritos ===
- Preceded by: Solar eclipse of March 19, 2007
- Followed by: Solar eclipse of January 14, 2029

=== Solar Saros 150 ===
- Preceded by: Solar eclipse of February 5, 2000
- Followed by: Solar eclipse of February 27, 2036

=== Inex ===
- Preceded by: Solar eclipse of March 7, 1989
- Followed by: Solar eclipse of January 26, 2047

=== Triad ===
- Preceded by: Solar eclipse of April 18, 1931
- Followed by: Solar eclipse of December 17, 2104

=== Solar eclipses of 2015–2018 ===
This eclipse is a member of a semester series. An eclipse in a semester series of solar eclipses repeats approximately every 177 days and 4 hours (a semester) at alternating nodes of the Moon's orbit.

The partial solar eclipse on July 13, 2018 occurs in the next lunar year eclipse set.

Solar eclipse series sets from 2015 to 2018
Descending node			Ascending node		
Saros	Map	Gamma	Saros	Map	Gamma
120 Totality in Longyearbyen, Svalbard	March 20, 2015 Total	0.94536	125 Solar Dynamics Observatory	September 13, 2015 Partial	−1.10039
130 Balikpapan, Indonesia	March 9, 2016 Total	0.26092	135 Annularity in L'Étang-Salé, Réunion	September 1, 2016 Annular	−0.33301
140 Partial from Buenos Aires, Argentina	February 26, 2017 Annular	−0.45780	145 Totality in Madras, OR, USA	August 21, 2017 Total	0.43671
150 Partial in Olivos, Buenos Aires, Argentina	February 15, 2018 Partial	−1.21163	155 Partial in Huittinen, Finland	August 11, 2018 Partial	1.14758

=== Saros 150 ===
This eclipse is a part of Saros series 150, repeating every 18 years, 11 days, and containing 71 events. The series started with a partial solar eclipse on August 24, 1729. It contains annular eclipses from April 22, 2126 through June 22, 2829. There are no hybrid or total eclipses in this set. The series ends at member 71 as a partial eclipse on September 29, 2991. Its eclipses are tabulated in three columns; every third eclipse in the same column is one exeligmos apart, so they all cast shadows over approximately the same parts of the Earth.

The longest duration of annularity will be produced by member 45 at 9 minutes, 58 seconds on December 19, 2522. All eclipses in this series occur at the Moon’s descending node of orbit.

Series members 5–27 occur between 1801 and 2200:
5	6	7
October 7, 1801	October 19, 1819	October 29, 1837
8	9	10
November 9, 1855	November 20, 1873	December 1, 1891
11	12	13
December 12, 1909	December 24, 1927	January 3, 1946
14	15	16
January 14, 1964	January 25, 1982	February 5, 2000
17	18	19
February 15, 2018	February 27, 2036	March 9, 2054
20	21	22
March 19, 2072	March 31, 2090	April 11, 2108
23	24	25
April 22, 2126	May 3, 2144	May 14, 2162
26	27	
May 24, 2180	June 4, 2198	

=== Metonic series ===
The metonic series repeats eclipses every 19 years (6939.69 days), lasting about 5 cycles. Eclipses occur in nearly the same calendar date. In addition, the octon subseries repeats 1/5 of that or every 3.8 years (1387.94 days). All eclipses in this table occur at the Moon's descending node.

21 eclipse events between July 11, 1953 and July 11, 2029
July 10–11	April 29–30	February 15–16	December 4	September 21–23
116	118	120	122	124
July 11, 1953	April 30, 1957	February 15, 1961	December 4, 1964	September 22, 1968
126	128	130	132	134
July 10, 1972	April 29, 1976	February 16, 1980	December 4, 1983	September 23, 1987
136	138	140	142	144
July 11, 1991	April 29, 1995	February 16, 1999	December 4, 2002	September 22, 2006
146	148	150	152	154
July 11, 2010	April 29, 2014	February 15, 2018	December 4, 2021	September 21, 2025
156
July 11, 2029

=== Tritos series ===
This eclipse is a part of a tritos cycle, repeating at alternating nodes every 135 synodic months (≈ 3986.63 days, or 11 years minus 1 month). Their appearance and longitude are irregular due to a lack of synchronization with the anomalistic month (period of perigee), but groupings of 3 tritos cycles (≈ 33 years minus 3 months) come close (≈ 434.044 anomalistic months), so eclipses are similar in these groupings.

The partial solar eclipses on December 7, 2170 (part of Saros 164) and November 7, 2181 (part of Saros 165) are also a part of this series but are not included in the table below.

Series members between 1801 and 2105
September 28, 1810 (Saros 131)	August 27, 1821 (Saros 132)	July 27, 1832 (Saros 133)	June 27, 1843 (Saros 134)	May 26, 1854 (Saros 135)
April 25, 1865 (Saros 136)	March 25, 1876 (Saros 137)	February 22, 1887 (Saros 138)	January 22, 1898 (Saros 139)	December 23, 1908 (Saros 140)
November 22, 1919 (Saros 141)	October 21, 1930 (Saros 142)	September 21, 1941 (Saros 143)	August 20, 1952 (Saros 144)	July 20, 1963 (Saros 145)
June 20, 1974 (Saros 146)	May 19, 1985 (Saros 147)	April 17, 1996 (Saros 148)	March 19, 2007 (Saros 149)	February 15, 2018 (Saros 150)
January 14, 2029 (Saros 151)	December 15, 2039 (Saros 152)	November 14, 2050 (Saros 153)	October 13, 2061 (Saros 154)	September 12, 2072 (Saros 155)
August 13, 2083 (Saros 156)	July 12, 2094 (Saros 157)	June 12, 2105 (Saros 158)		

=== Inex series ===
This eclipse is a part of the long period inex cycle, repeating at alternating nodes, every 358 synodic months (≈ 10,571.95 days, or 29 years minus 20 days). Their appearance and longitude are irregular due to a lack of synchronization with the anomalistic month (period of perigee). However, groupings of 3 inex cycles (≈ 87 years minus 2 months) comes close (≈ 1,151.02 anomalistic months), so eclipses are similar in these groupings.

Series members between 1801 and 2200
July 6, 1815 (Saros 143)	June 16, 1844 (Saros 144)	May 26, 1873 (Saros 145)
May 7, 1902 (Saros 146)	April 18, 1931 (Saros 147)	March 27, 1960 (Saros 148)
March 7, 1989 (Saros 149)	February 15, 2018 (Saros 150)	January 26, 2047 (Saros 151)
January 6, 2076 (Saros 152)	December 17, 2104 (Saros 153)	November 26, 2133 (Saros 154)
November 7, 2162 (Saros 155)	October 18, 2191 (Saros 156)	
