= Arrondissement of Saint-Pierre, Réunion =

Coordinates: 21°20′19″S 55°28′29″E

Saint-Pierre
- Arrondissement
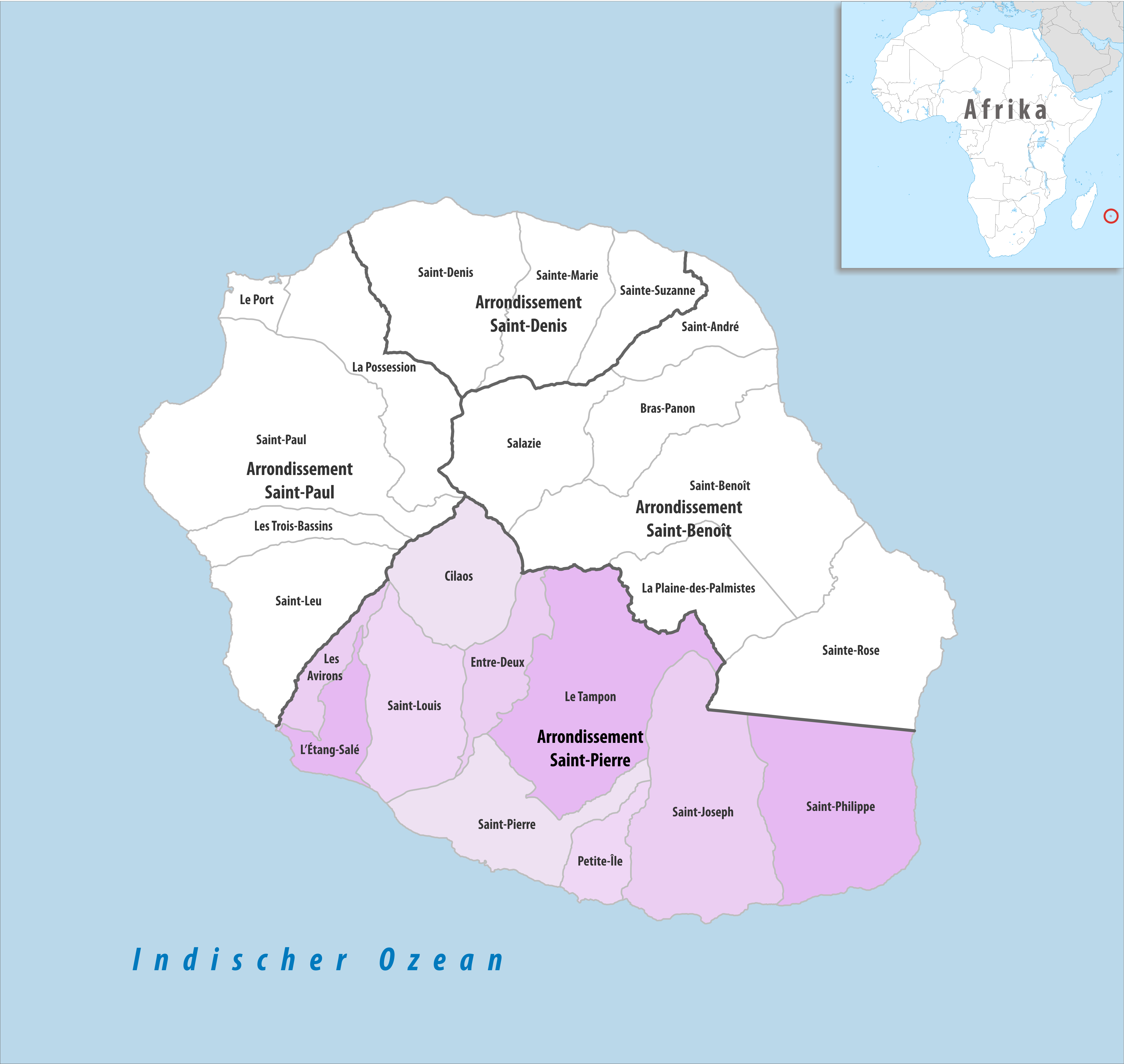
- Location within Réunion
- Country: France
- Overseas region and department: Réunion{{{region}}}
- No. of communes: {{{nbcomm}}}
- Area: 942.8 km^{2} (364.0 sq mi)
- Population (2023): 318,130
  - Density: 337.4/km^{2} (873.9/sq mi)
- INSEE code: 9742

The arrondissement of Saint-Pierre is an arrondissement of France in the Réunion department in the Réunion region. It has 10 communes. Its population is 314,218 (2021), and its area is 942.8 km^{2} (364.0 sq mi).

== Composition ==
The communes of the arrondissement of Saint-Pierre, and their INSEE codes, are:

1. Les Avirons (97401)
2. Cilaos (97424)
3. Entre-Deux (97403)
4. L'Étang-Salé (97404)
5. Petite-Île (97405)
6. Saint-Joseph (97412)
7. Saint-Louis (97414)
8. Saint-Philippe (97417)
9. Saint-Pierre (97416)
10. Le Tampon (97422)

== History ==
The arrondissement of Saint-Pierre, containing 11 communes that were previously part of the arrondissement of Saint-Denis, was created in 1964. It lost four communes to the new arrondissement of Saint-Paul in 1969. In September 2006 it absorbed the two communes of Les Avirons and L'Étang-Salé from the arrondissement of Saint-Paul.

As a result of the reorganisation of the cantons of France which came into effect in 2015, the borders of the cantons are no longer related to the borders of the arrondissements. The cantons of the arrondissement of Saint-Pierre were, as of January 2015:

1. Les Avirons
2. Entre-Deux
3. L'Étang-Salé
4. Petite-Île
5. Saint-Joseph-1
6. Saint-Joseph-2
7. Saint-Louis-1
8. Saint-Louis-2
9. Saint-Louis-3
10. Saint-Philippe
11. Saint-Pierre-1
12. Saint-Pierre-2
13. Saint-Pierre-3
14. Saint-Pierre-4
15. Le Tampon-1
16. Le Tampon-2
17. Le Tampon-3
18. Le Tampon-4
