= Arrondissement of Saint-Pierre =

There are two arrondissements of Saint-Pierre in France:

- Arrondissement of Saint-Pierre, Martinique
- Arrondissement of Saint-Pierre, Réunion
