= 1952 in Réunion =

- Decades: 1930s; 1940s; 1950s; 1960s; 1970s
- See also: Other events of 1952; History of Réunion

The following lists events that happened during 1952 in Réunion.

== Events ==
=== March ===
- March 15–16 - A rain gauge at Cilaos recorded 1,870 millimetres of rain in a 24-hour period, which was initially treated as the world record for rainfall in a 24-hour period. The World Meteorological Organization now regards the value as invalid due to Réunion meteorologists stating that the figure is "an old mistake."
