= Le Gouffre =

Le Gouffre is a village in the southwest of the island of Réunion. The commonly used name is a shortening of Le Gouffre de l'Etang-Salé. It is located four kilometres south of Les Avirons and eight kilometres west of Saint-Louis.
