= Les Avirons =

Commune in Réunion, France

- Commune
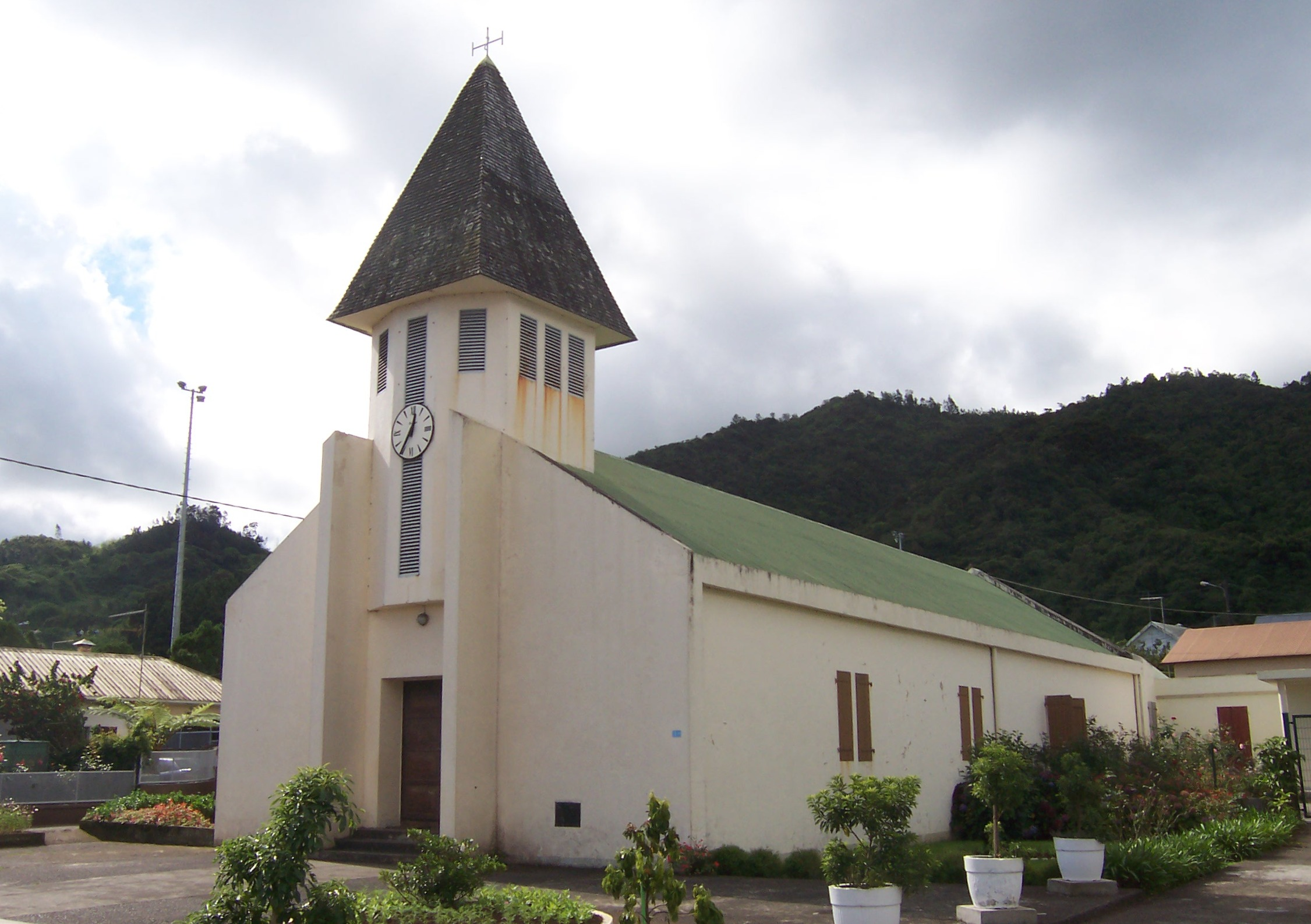

- Coat of arms

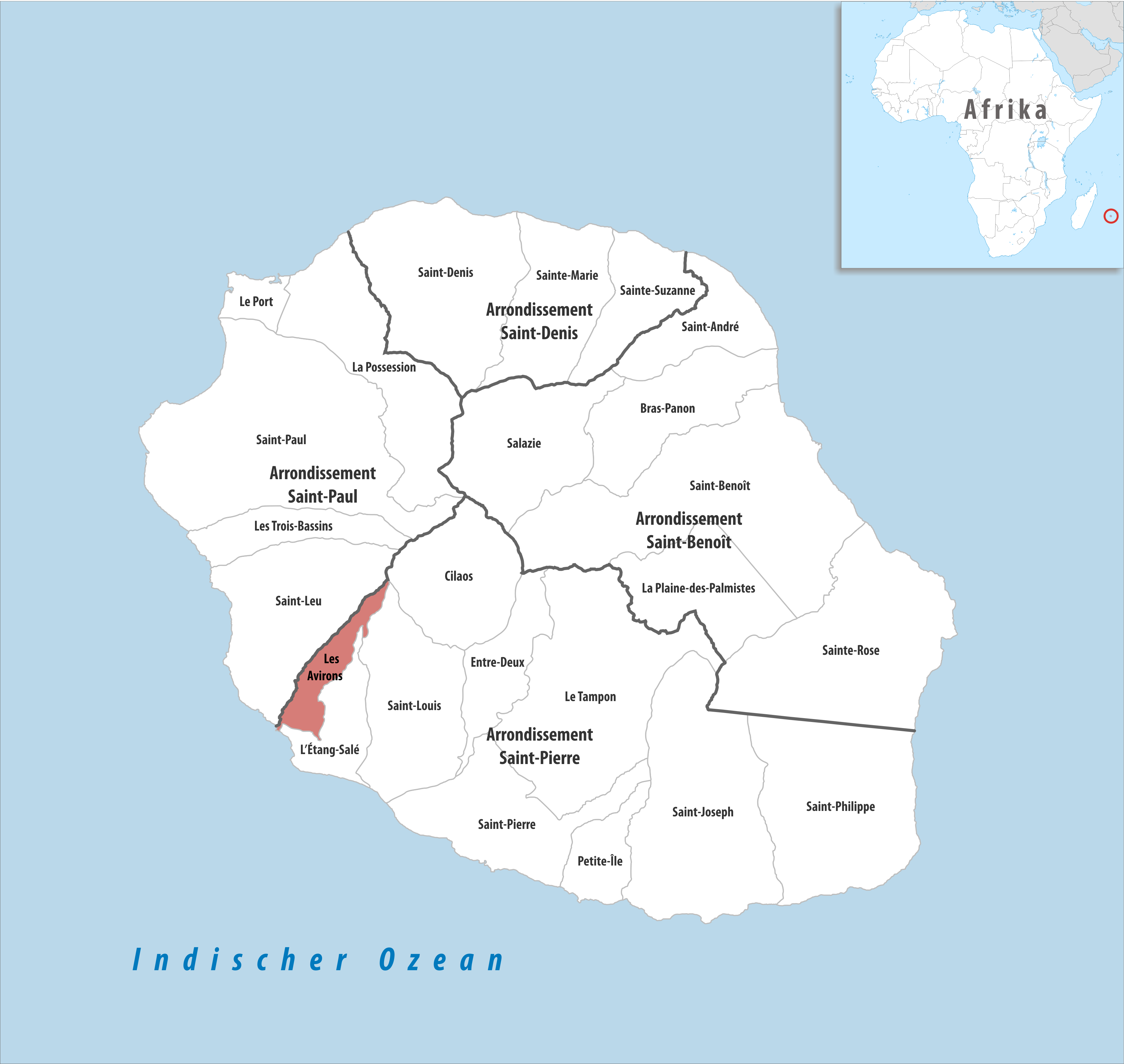
- Location of Les Avirons
- Coordinates: 21°14′31″S 55°20′00″E
- Country: France
- Overseas region and department: Réunion
- Arrondissement: Saint-Pierre
- Canton: L'Étang-Salé
- Intercommunality: Villes solidaires

Government
  - Mayor (2020–2026): Eric Ferrere
- Area^{1}: 26.27 km^{2} (10.14 sq mi)
- Elevation: 268 m (879 ft)
- Highest elevation: 2,565 m (8,415 ft)
- Lowest elevation: 0 m (0 ft)
- Population (2023): 11,536
  - Density: 439.1/km^{2} (1,137/sq mi)
- Time zone: UTC+04:00
- INSEE/Postal code: 97401 /97425
- ^{1} French Land Register data, which excludes lakes, ponds, glaciers > 1 km^{2} (0.386 sq mi or 247 acres) and river estuaries.

Les Avirons (French pronunciation: [lez‿aviʁɔ̃], meaning "the oars" in French), is a commune in the Réunion overseas department of France in the Indian Ocean. It borders the communes of Saint-Leu, Cilaos, Saint-Louis and L'Étang-Salé, and 150 metres of coastline.

== Geography ==
=== Climate ===
Les Avirons has a tropical savanna climate (Köppen climate classification Aw). The average annual temperature in Les Avirons is 24.2 °C (75.6 °F). The average annual rainfall is 805.2 mm (31.70 in) with January as the wettest month. The temperatures are highest on average in January, at around 27.2 °C (81.0 °F), and lowest in July, at around 21.0 °C (69.8 °F). The highest temperature ever recorded in Les Avirons was 36.8 °C (98.2 °F) on 22 January 2009; the coldest temperature ever recorded was 13.7 °C (56.7 °F) on 1 August 2003.

Climate data for Les Avirons (1991−2020 normals, extremes 2002−2016)
Month	Jan	Feb	Mar	Apr	May	Jun	Jul	Aug	Sep	Oct	Nov	Dec	Year
Record high °C (°F)	36.8 (98.2)	36.5 (97.7)	35.6 (96.1)	33.5 (92.3)	32.4 (90.3)	29.6 (85.3)	30.4 (86.7)	28.4 (83.1)	30.2 (86.4)	31.2 (88.2)	33.2 (91.8)	34.6 (94.3)	36.8 (98.2)
Mean daily maximum °C (°F)	31.3 (88.3)	31.0 (87.8)	30.5 (86.9)	29.3 (84.7)	27.3 (81.1)	25.6 (78.1)	24.7 (76.5)	25.0 (77.0)	26.1 (79.0)	27.5 (81.5)	29.2 (84.6)	30.6 (87.1)	28.2 (82.8)
Daily mean °C (°F)	27.2 (81.0)	27.1 (80.8)	26.5 (79.7)	25.4 (77.7)	23.6 (74.5)	22.0 (71.6)	21.0 (69.8)	21.1 (70.0)	21.9 (71.4)	23.2 (73.8)	24.7 (76.5)	26.3 (79.3)	24.2 (75.6)
Mean daily minimum °C (°F)	23.1 (73.6)	23.2 (73.8)	22.6 (72.7)	21.5 (70.7)	19.9 (67.8)	18.3 (64.9)	17.3 (63.1)	17.1 (62.8)	17.7 (63.9)	18.9 (66.0)	20.3 (68.5)	22.1 (71.8)	20.2 (68.4)
Record low °C (°F)	20.0 (68.0)	20.0 (68.0)	19.5 (67.1)	18.0 (64.4)	15.0 (59.0)	13.8 (56.8)	14.4 (57.9)	13.7 (56.7)	14.2 (57.6)	14.2 (57.6)	16.4 (61.5)	19.3 (66.7)	13.7 (56.7)
Average precipitation mm (inches)	148.0 (5.83)	126.8 (4.99)	110.7 (4.36)	89.3 (3.52)	53.0 (2.09)	46.1 (1.81)	50.8 (2.00)	26.5 (1.04)	24.6 (0.97)	26.9 (1.06)	33.9 (1.33)	68.6 (2.70)	805.2 (31.70)
Average precipitation days (≥ 1.0 mm)	8.4	7.9	7.3	6.1	4.8	4.2	4.4	3.0	2.5	2.3	2.8	5.1	58.9
Source: Météo-France

== Population ==
Historical population
Year	Pop.	±% p.a.
1967	4,547	—
1974	4,863	+0.96%
1982	5,150	+0.72%
1990	5,935	+1.79%
1999	7,172	+2.13%
2007	10,093	+4.36%
2012	11,181	+2.07%
2017	11,345	+0.29%
2023	11,536	+0.28%
Source: INSEE

== See also ==
- Communes of the Réunion department
