= L'Étang-Salé =

Commune in Réunion, France

- Commune
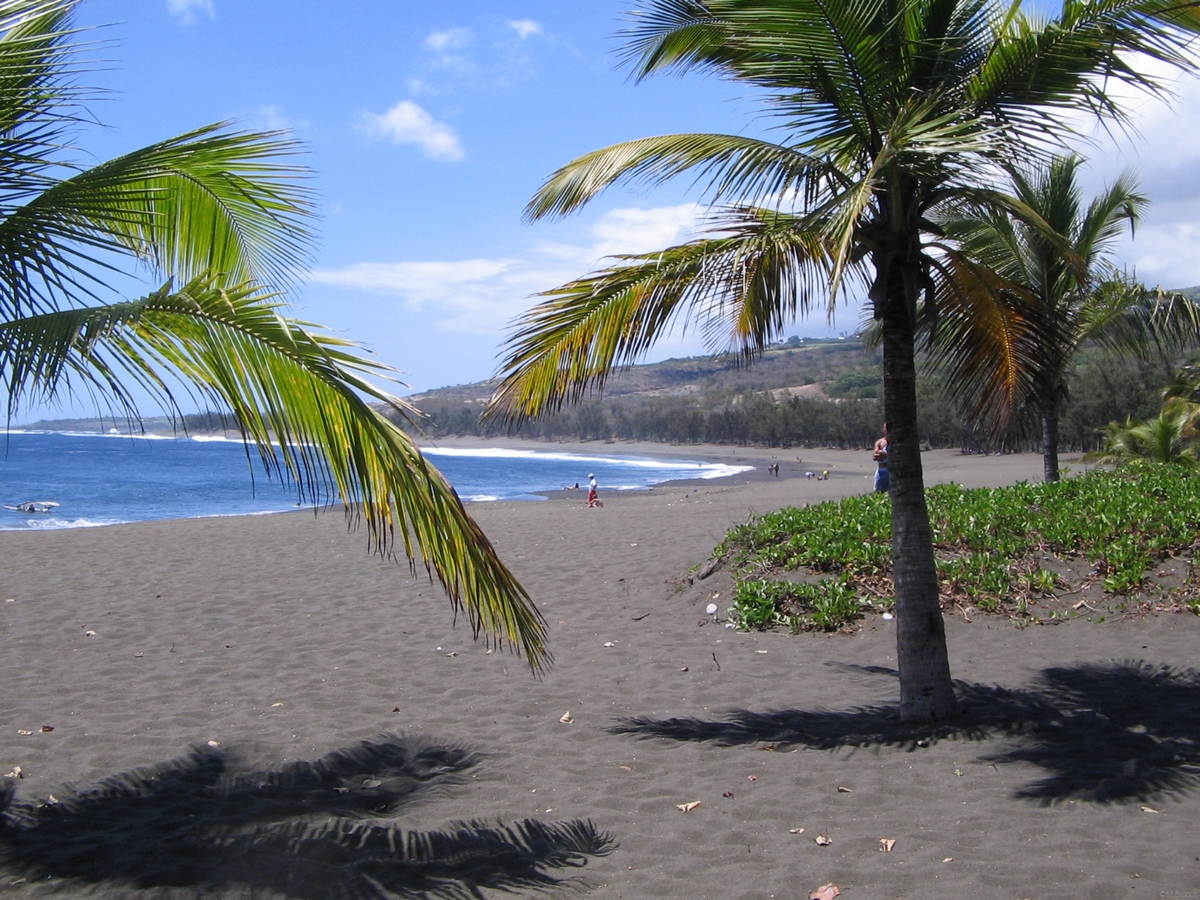
- Beach of L'Étang-Salé

- Coat of arms

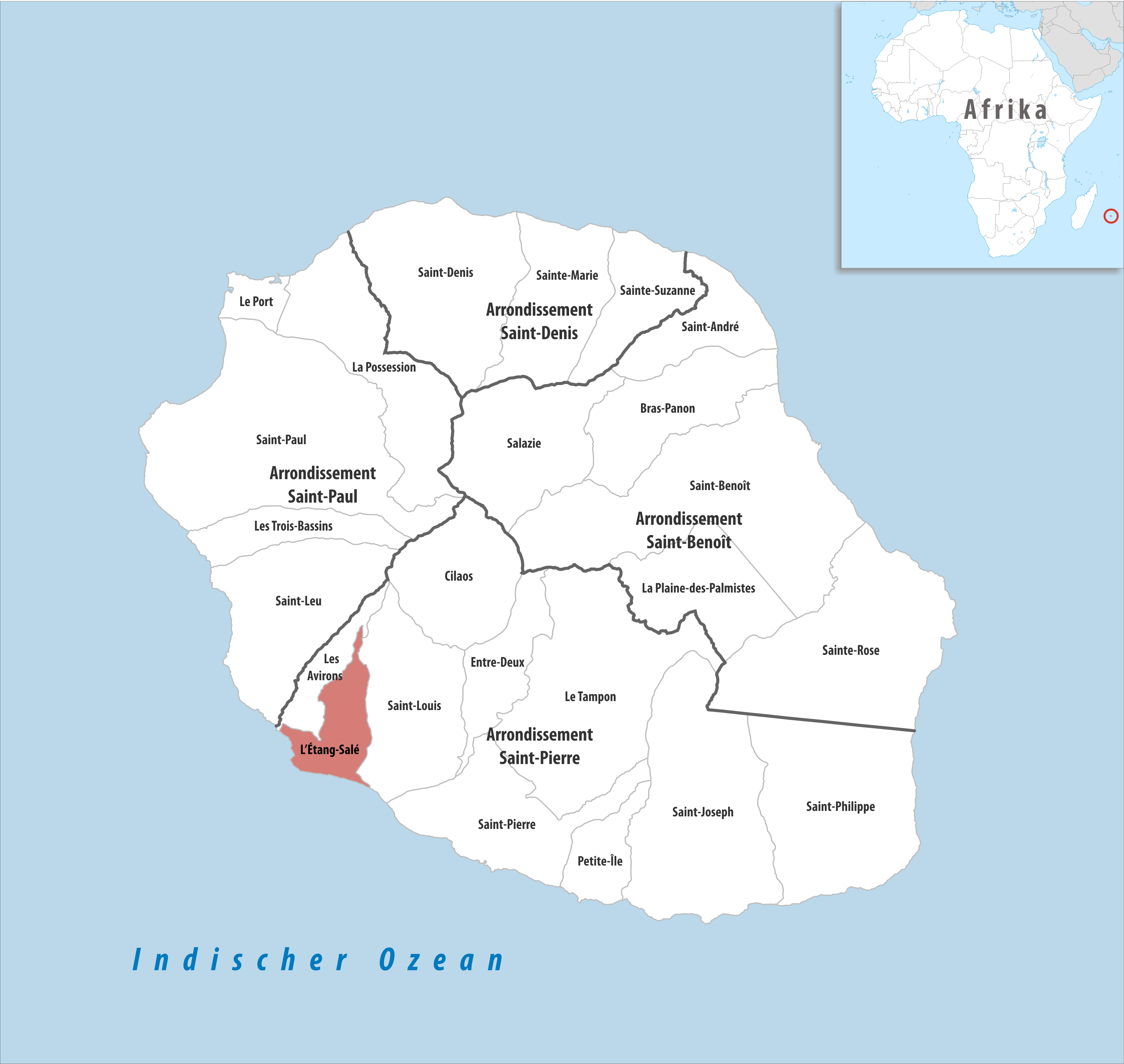
- Location of L'Étang-Salé
- Coordinates: 21°15′58″S 55°22′01″E
- Country: France
- Overseas region and department: Réunion
- Arrondissement: Saint-Pierre
- Canton: L'Étang-Salé
- Intercommunality: Villes solidaires

Government
  - Mayor (2022–2026): Mathieu Hoarau
- Area^{1}: 38.65 km^{2} (14.92 sq mi)
- Elevation: 31 m (102 ft)
- Highest elevation: 1,781 m (5,843 ft)
- Lowest elevation: 0 m (0 ft)
- Population (2023): 14,464
  - Density: 374.2/km^{2} (969.3/sq mi)
- Time zone: UTC+04:00
- INSEE/Postal code: 97404 /97427
- ^{1} French Land Register data, which excludes lakes, ponds, glaciers > 1 km^{2} (0.386 sq mi or 247 acres) and river estuaries.

L'Étang-Salé (French pronunciation: [letɑ̃ sale]; French for The Salty Pond) is a commune in southwestern Réunion, a department in the Indian Ocean. It is bordered by the communes of Les Avirons and Saint-Louis. Within the commune is the Étang-Salé forest. There is also a beach with black sand in the commune that is a popular surfing spot.

== Geography ==
=== Climate ===
L'Étang-Salé has a tropical savanna climate (Köppen climate classification Aw) closely bordering on a hot semi-arid climate (BSh). The average annual temperature in L'Étang-Salé is 23.6 °C (74.5 °F). The average annual rainfall is 619.5 mm (24.39 in) with February as the wettest month. The temperatures are highest on average in February, at around 27.1 °C (80.8 °F), and lowest in July, at around 20.1 °C (68.2 °F). The highest temperature ever recorded in L'Étang-Salé was 36.4 °C (97.5 °F) on 13 March 2004; the coldest temperature ever recorded was 8.0 °C (46.4 °F) on 15 August 1992.

Climate data for L'Étang-Salé (1981−2010 normals, extremes 1961−2008)
Month	Jan	Feb	Mar	Apr	May	Jun	Jul	Aug	Sep	Oct	Nov	Dec	Year
Record high °C (°F)	36.2 (97.2)	36.2 (97.2)	36.4 (97.5)	34.1 (93.4)	33.0 (91.4)	31.2 (88.2)	29.8 (85.6)	30.1 (86.2)	31.0 (87.8)	32.5 (90.5)	33.9 (93.0)	35.3 (95.5)	36.4 (97.5)
Mean daily maximum °C (°F)	32.1 (89.8)	32.0 (89.6)	31.6 (88.9)	30.5 (86.9)	28.6 (83.5)	26.8 (80.2)	26.0 (78.8)	26.3 (79.3)	26.9 (80.4)	28.2 (82.8)	29.6 (85.3)	31.0 (87.8)	29.1 (84.4)
Daily mean °C (°F)	26.9 (80.4)	27.1 (80.8)	26.4 (79.5)	25.2 (77.4)	23.1 (73.6)	21.1 (70.0)	20.1 (68.2)	20.3 (68.5)	20.9 (69.6)	22.3 (72.1)	23.9 (75.0)	25.7 (78.3)	23.6 (74.5)
Mean daily minimum °C (°F)	21.7 (71.1)	22.3 (72.1)	21.2 (70.2)	19.9 (67.8)	17.5 (63.5)	15.5 (59.9)	14.2 (57.6)	14.1 (57.4)	14.9 (58.8)	16.3 (61.3)	18.1 (64.6)	20.4 (68.7)	18.0 (64.4)
Record low °C (°F)	16.0 (60.8)	15.5 (59.9)	15.1 (59.2)	14.1 (57.4)	10.0 (50.0)	8.8 (47.8)	9.1 (48.4)	8.0 (46.4)	9.9 (49.8)	11.0 (51.8)	12.3 (54.1)	13.8 (56.8)	8.0 (46.4)
Average precipitation mm (inches)	93.0 (3.66)	108.2 (4.26)	90.2 (3.55)	69.3 (2.73)	41.6 (1.64)	40.7 (1.60)	37.2 (1.46)	20.8 (0.82)	18.7 (0.74)	20.8 (0.82)	25.1 (0.99)	53.9 (2.12)	619.5 (24.39)
Average precipitation days (≥ 1.0 mm)	5.7	7.1	6.1	5.5	4.4	4.7	3.5	2.9	2.4	2.1	2.0	4.4	50.8
Source: Météo-France

== Demography ==
Historical population
Year	Pop.	±% p.a.
1967	6,510	—
1974	6,610	+0.22%
1982	7,479	+1.56%
1990	8,769	+2.01%
1999	11,755	+3.31%
2007	13,179	+1.44%
2012	13,647	+0.70%
2017	13,894	+0.36%
2023	14,464	+0.67%
Source: INSEE

== Economy and tourism ==
- there is an industrial zone in L'Étang-Salé
- a popular surfing beach in L'Étang-Salé-les-Bains
- several hotels
- an 18-hole golf course
- Croc' Park - a crocodile park

== Images ==
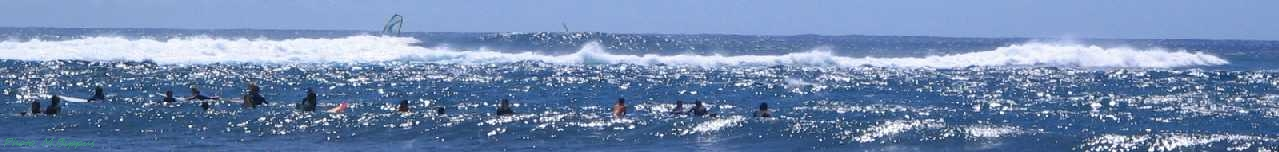
Surfing in Etang-Salé

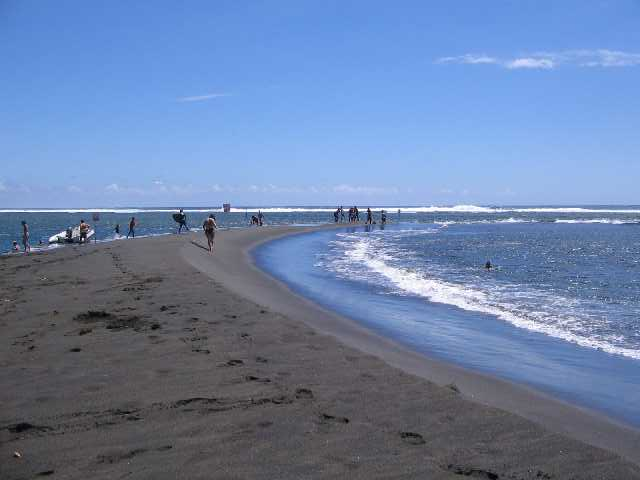
The beach of L'Étang-Salé

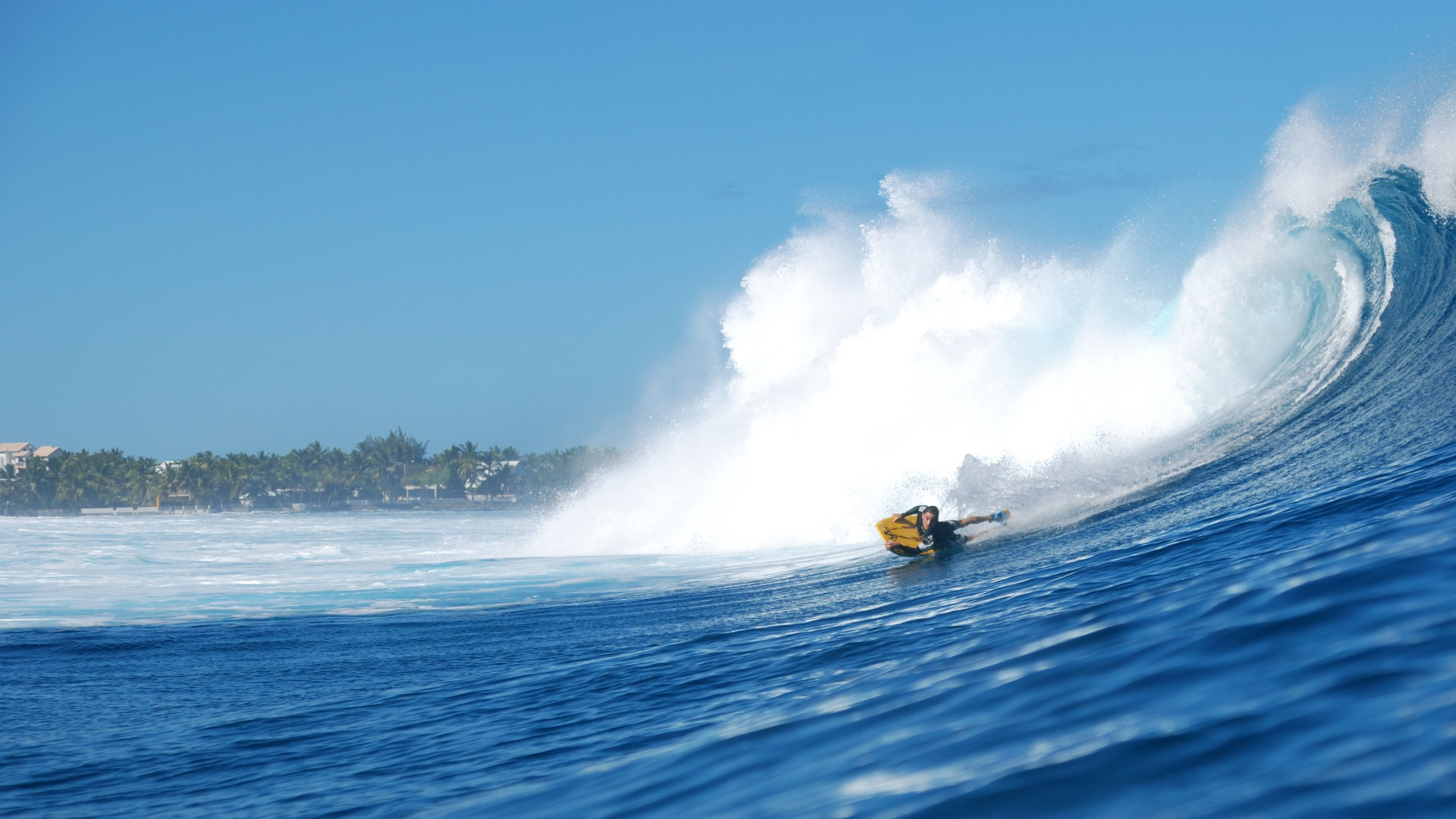
Surfer at L'Étang-Salé

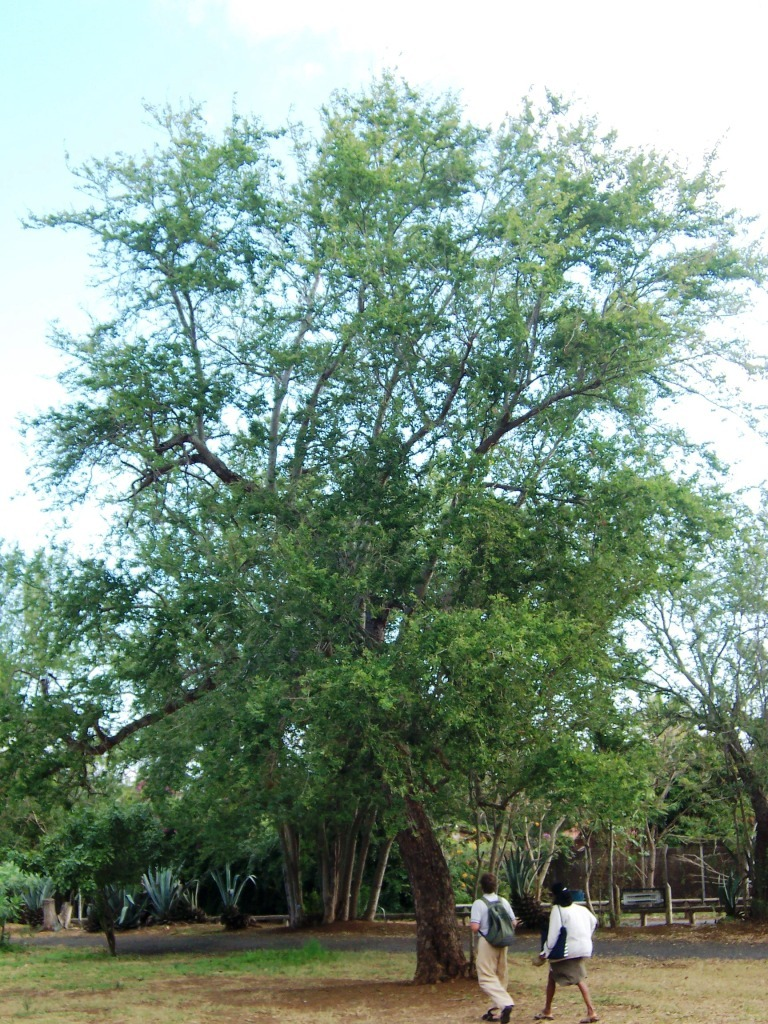
Forest of L'Étang-Salé

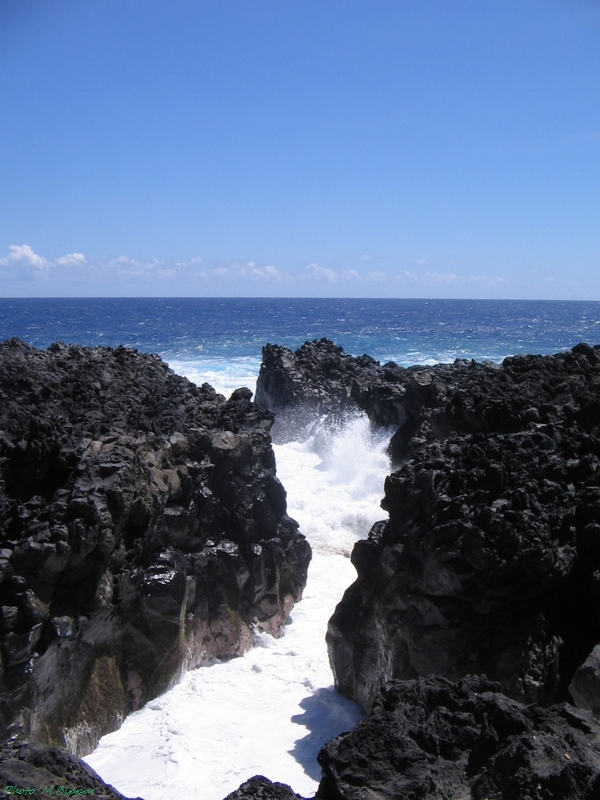
The Gouffre - a lava formation at the coast

== See also ==
- Communes of the Réunion department
- Le Gouffre
