= Communauté intercommunale des Villes solidaires =

- Communauté d'agglomération
- Country: France
- Overseas region and department: Réunion{{{region}}}
- No. of communes: {{{nbcomm}}}
- Established: 2002
- Area: 378.1 km^{2} (146.0 sq mi)
- Population (2018): 181,704
  - Density: 480.6/km^{2} (1,245/sq mi)

Communauté intercommunale des Villes solidaires (CIVIS) is the communauté d'agglomération, an intercommunal structure, centred on the city of Saint-Pierre. It is located in Réunion, an overseas department and region of France. It was created in December 2002. Its area is 378.1 km^{2}. Its population was 181,704 in 2018, of which 84,961 in Saint-Pierre proper.

== Composition ==
The communauté d'agglomération consists of the following 6 communes:

1. Les Avirons
2. Cilaos
3. L'Étang-Salé
4. Petite-Île
5. Saint-Louis
6. Saint-Pierre
