= Cilaos =

Commune in Réunion, France

- Commune
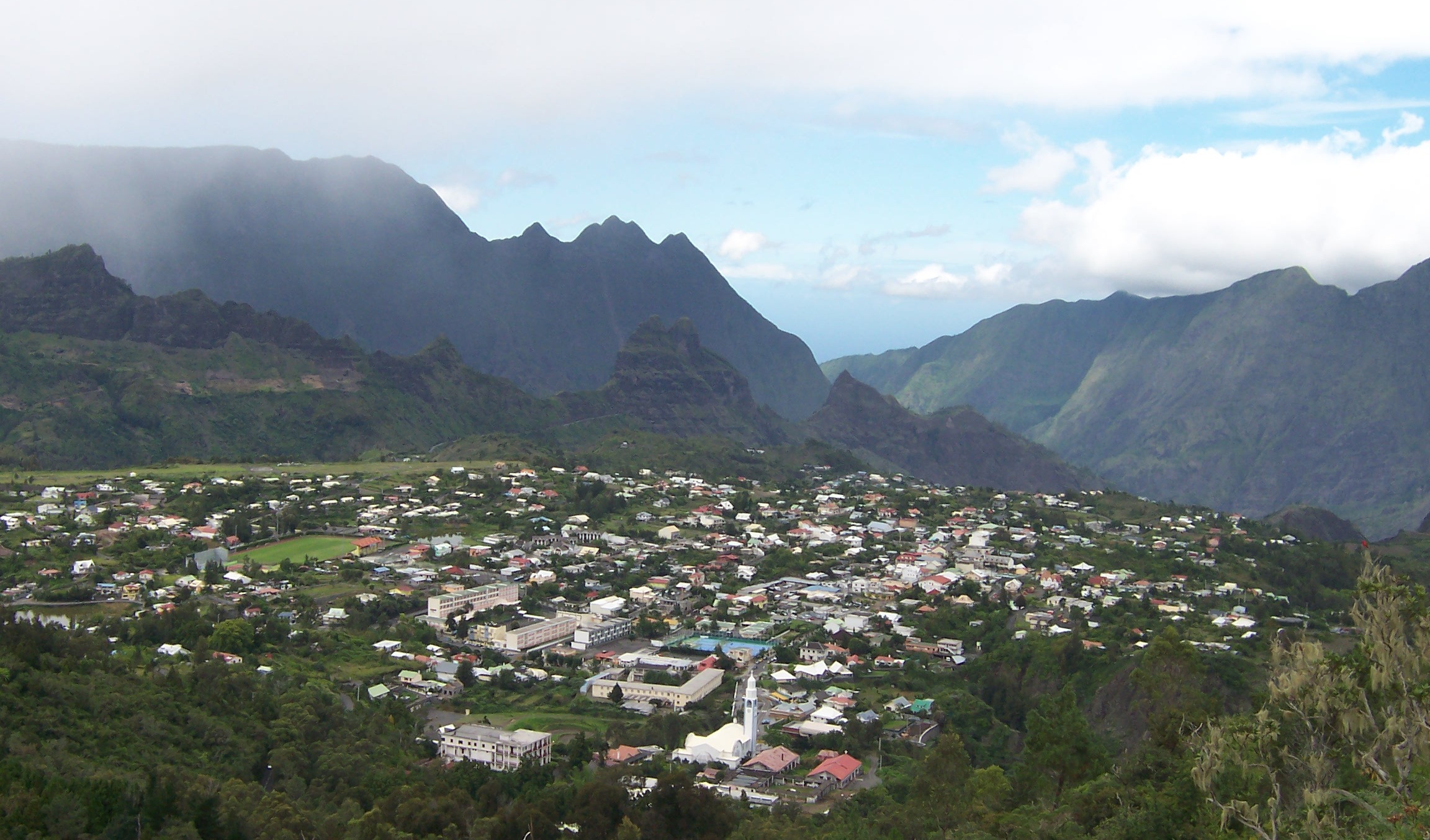
- Cilaos town, high in the Cirque.

- Coat of arms

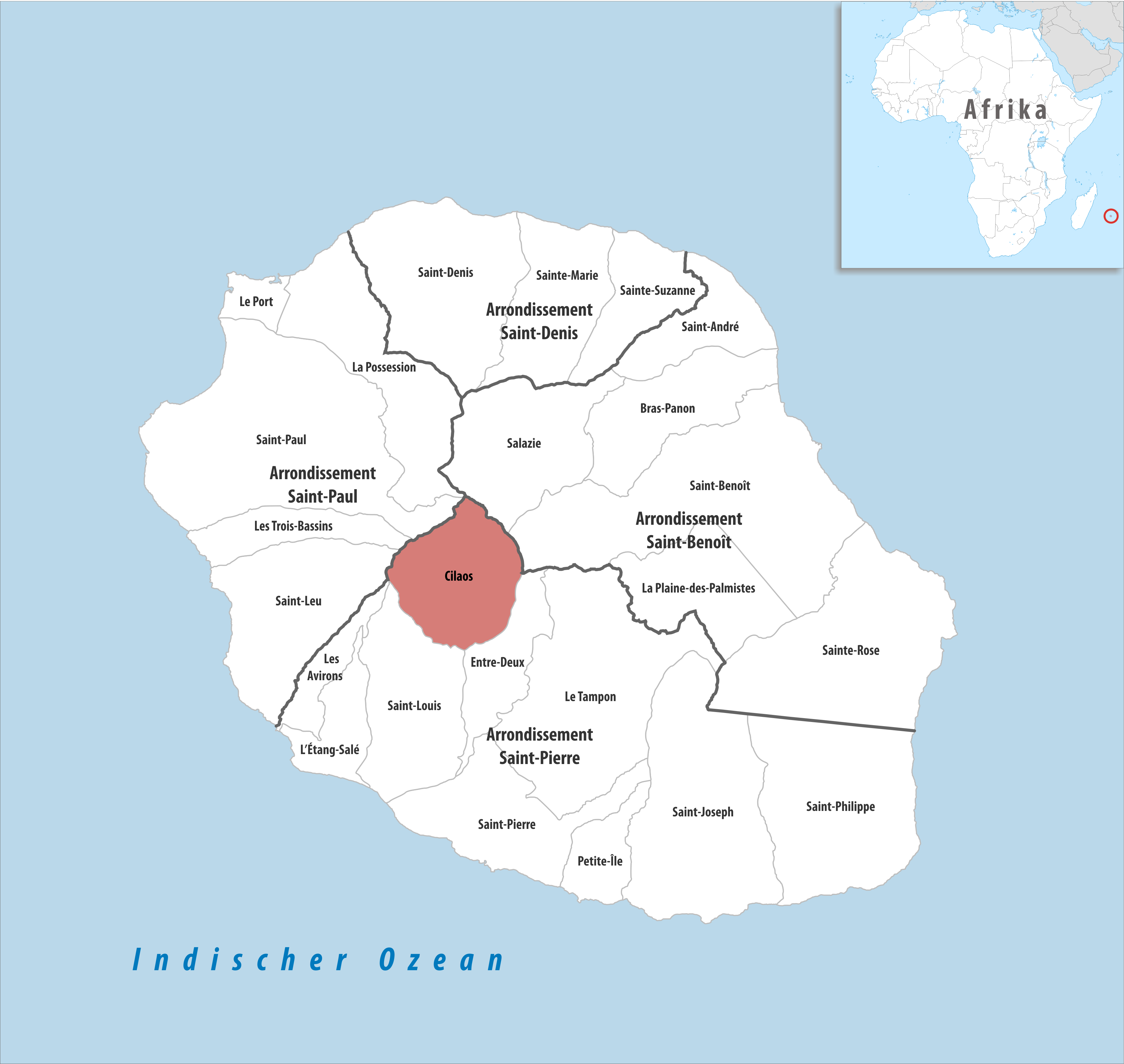
- Location of Cilaos
- Coordinates: 21°08′07″S 55°28′16″E
- Country: France
- Overseas region and department: Réunion
- Arrondissement: Saint-Pierre
- Canton: Saint-Louis-2
- Intercommunality: Villes solidaires

Government
  - Mayor (2020–2026): Jacques Técher
- Area^{1}: 84.40 km^{2} (32.59 sq mi)
- Elevation: 1,201 m (3,940 ft)
- Highest elevation: 3,071 m (10,075 ft)
- Lowest elevation: 370 m (1,210 ft)
- Population (2023): 5,040
  - Density: 59.7/km^{2} (155/sq mi)
- Time zone: UTC+04:00
- INSEE/Postal code: 97424 /97413
- ^{1} French Land Register data, which excludes lakes, ponds, glaciers > 1 km^{2} (0.386 sq mi or 247 acres) and river estuaries.

Cilaos (French pronunciation: [silaɔs]) is a town and commune on the French island of Réunion in the Indian Ocean. It is located centrally on the island, in a caldera of altitude 1,214 m. The caldera (usually known as the 'Cirque') is also named for the community.

== History ==
The name Cilaos comes from the Malagasy word, Tsilaosa (modern form: tsy ilaozana), which means the place one does not abandon.

According to some historians, the word Cilaos finds its origins in the name of a Malagasy slave named Tsilaos who took refuge in this cirque. At the time, slaves were called "brown", whereas runaway slaves were called "black-brown".

The first inhabitants of the cirque of Cilaos were thus "black-browns" who believed themselves to be at the top of the world and completely safe. However, these first runaways were recaptured very quickly, tracked and hunted by well-organized and well-armed slaveholders. In these runaways' attempts to escape recapture, several were killed. It seems likely that these first runaways created the goat paths that climb most of the mountains on Réunion.

After the death or recapture of these runaway slaves, the cirque of Cilaos likely became uninhabited once again for a while, since the first official record of its settlement occurs only around 1850. In this year, a spa station was set up, and by 1866, there were 960 inhabitants. By 1900, the population had risen to 2500, and the 1982 census recorded 5629 inhabitants in the whole cirque.

From 7 to 8 January 1966, 1,825mm (72 inches) of rain fell in Cilaos in 24 hours, the greatest amount of rain ever to fall in one day.

The commune of Cilaos was created on 4 February 1965 when it seceded from the commune of Saint-Louis.

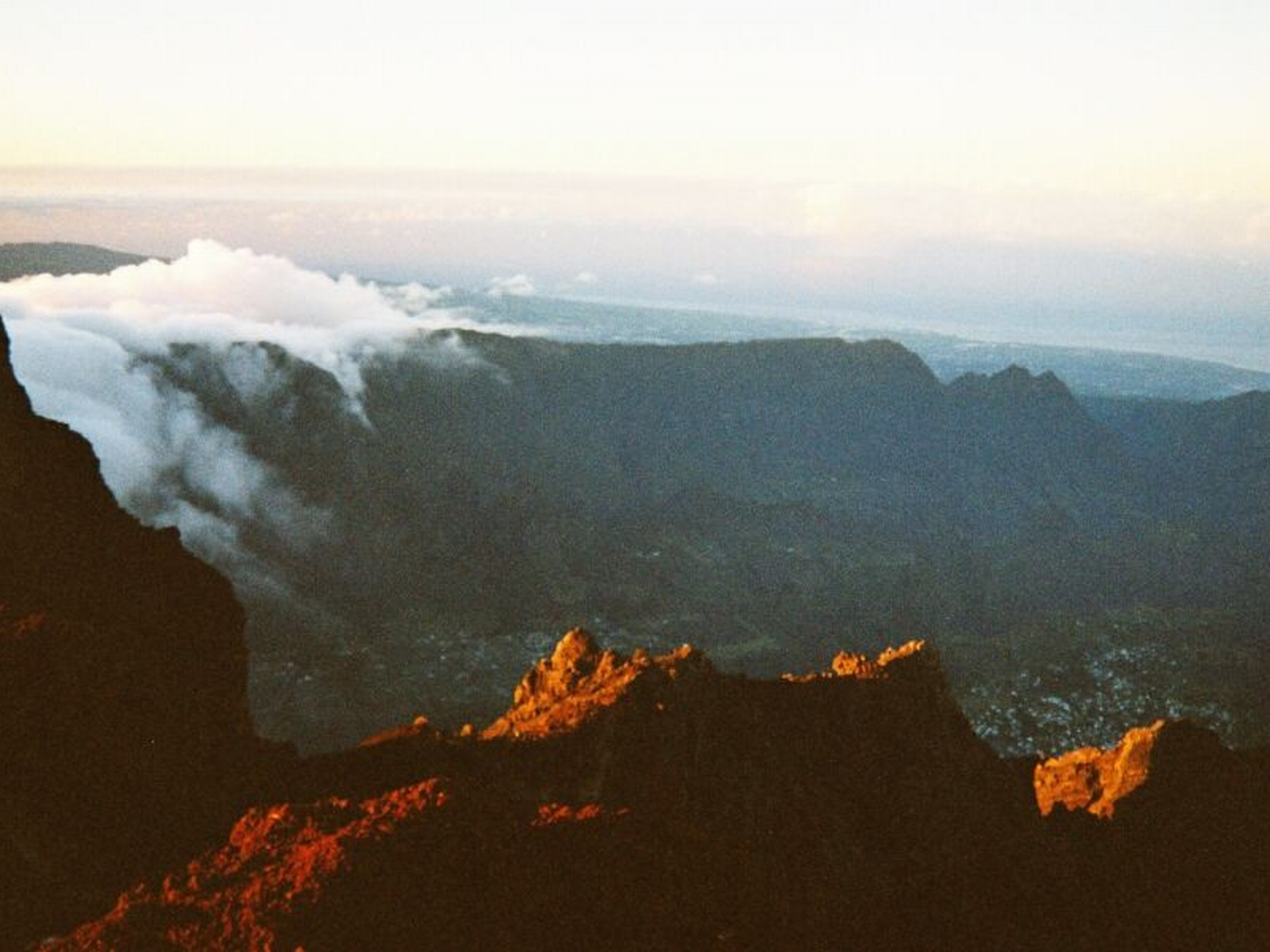
The cirque as seen from the Piton des Neiges.

== Population ==
Historical population
Year	Pop.	±% p.a.
1967	5,586	—
1974	5,672	+0.22%
1982	5,735	+0.14%
1990	5,856	+0.26%
1999	6,115	+0.48%
2007	5,796	−0.67%
2012	5,440	−1.26%
2017	5,456	+0.06%
2023	5,040	−1.31%
Source: INSEE

== Embroidery ==
The introduction of embroidery was due to the efforts of Angèle MacAuliffe, daughter of a doctor who worked at a hot-spring clinic in the early 20th century. The techniques that she introduced have scarcely changed since, and the popularity of "Days of Cilaos" embroidery is due in a large part to this stability and tradition.

This local embroidery has been transmitted for over 100 years by local nuns (such as Sister Cécile and Sister Irénée). In 1954, the "Sewing room of Cilaos" was created and Sister Anasthasie (Marie-Hélène Techer) was appointed as its leader. Sister Anasthasie would do her utmost to teach a hundred young girls her embroidery techniques, and she was recognized in 1983 when she received the gold medal "Best worker in France" competition in the lace and embroidery category. In the 1980s, these embroidered works were generally sold out of the workers' homes or more frequently from roadside stands. Furthermore, an association for the promotion of Cilaosian lace was created in 1983 to protect and develop this important craft of the Cirque. In 1985, this association had 50 embroidery workers. Its president was Ms. Suzanne Maillot, Sister Anasthasie's assistant at the "Sewing-room of Cilaos".

The embroidery house of the association (Maison de la Broderie) produces and displays works of this tradition.

== Climate ==
Cilaos has a subtropical highland climate (Cwb), with a mild to warm, very rainy wet season from December to April, and a drier, mild season the rest of the year.

Climate data for Cilaos (altitude 1197m, 1991–2020 averages, extremes 1969–present)
Month	Jan	Feb	Mar	Apr	May	Jun	Jul	Aug	Sep	Oct	Nov	Dec	Year
Record high °C (°F)	32.0 (89.6)	30.5 (86.9)	30.1 (86.2)	28.5 (83.3)	26.8 (80.2)	26.6 (79.9)	24.1 (75.4)	25.6 (78.1)	25.5 (77.9)	28.9 (84.0)	29.8 (85.6)	30.1 (86.2)	32.0 (89.6)
Mean daily maximum °C (°F)	25.5 (77.9)	25.4 (77.7)	25.0 (77.0)	24.0 (75.2)	22.1 (71.8)	20.2 (68.4)	19.4 (66.9)	19.9 (67.8)	20.8 (69.4)	22.4 (72.3)	23.9 (75.0)	25.1 (77.2)	22.8 (73.0)
Daily mean °C (°F)	20.4 (68.7)	20.5 (68.9)	19.9 (67.8)	18.6 (65.5)	16.4 (61.5)	14.2 (57.6)	13.4 (56.1)	13.7 (56.7)	14.5 (58.1)	16.1 (61.0)	17.7 (63.9)	19.3 (66.7)	17.1 (62.8)
Mean daily minimum °C (°F)	15.3 (59.5)	15.6 (60.1)	14.8 (58.6)	13.1 (55.6)	10.6 (51.1)	8.2 (46.8)	7.4 (45.3)	7.4 (45.3)	8.2 (46.8)	9.8 (49.6)	11.5 (52.7)	13.6 (56.5)	11.3 (52.3)
Record low °C (°F)	7.9 (46.2)	7.8 (46.0)	7.2 (45.0)	5.4 (41.7)	2.9 (37.2)	1.2 (34.2)	0.5 (32.9)	0.1 (32.2)	1.7 (35.1)	3.0 (37.4)	3.5 (38.3)	6.5 (43.7)	0.1 (32.2)
Average precipitation mm (inches)	433.9 (17.08)	455.8 (17.94)	328.2 (12.92)	104.5 (4.11)	64.0 (2.52)	44.7 (1.76)	43.1 (1.70)	32.6 (1.28)	31.7 (1.25)	32.8 (1.29)	53.4 (2.10)	140.0 (5.51)	1,764.7 (69.48)
Average precipitation days (≥ 1.0 mm)	13.2	13.3	11.1	8.7	6.5	5.5	5.5	3.7	4.0	4.0	5.4	9.1	90.1
Mean monthly sunshine hours	165.2	134.6	168.2	163.8	178.9	176.6	187.7	201.1	195.0	189.2	189.3	162.5	2,112.1
Source 1: Meteo France
Source 2: Meteociel.fr (sunshine 1981-2010)

== See also ==
- Communes of the Réunion department
