= Canton of Saint-Louis-2 =

Administrative division of Réunion

Coordinates: 21.27°S 55.44°E

The canton of Saint-Louis-2 is an administrative division of Réunion, an overseas department and region of France. Its borders were modified at the French canton reorganisation which came into effect in March 2015. Its seat is in Saint-Louis.

It consists of the following communes:

1. Cilaos
2. Entre-Deux
3. Saint-Louis (partly)
