= Canton of L'Étang-Salé =

Coordinates: 21.26°S 55.36°E

L'Étang-Salé
- Canton
- Interactive map of L'Étang-Salé
- Country: France
- Overseas region and department: Réunion{{{region}}}
- No. of communes: {{{nbcomm}}}

Government
  - Representatives (2021–2028): Louise Simbaye; Eric Ferrere
- Population (2023): 30,905
- INSEE code: 97401

The canton of L'Étang-Salé is an administrative division of Réunion, an overseas department and region of France. Its borders were modified at the French canton reorganisation which came into effect in March 2015. Its seat is in L'Étang-Salé.

== Composition ==
It consists of the following communes:

1. Les Avirons
2. L'Étang-Salé
3. Saint-Leu (partly)

== Councillors ==
Election	Councillors	Party	Occupation
2015	Annie Hoarau	DVD	
2015	Jean-Claude Lacouture	LR	Mayor of L'Étang-Salé

== Pictures of the canton ==
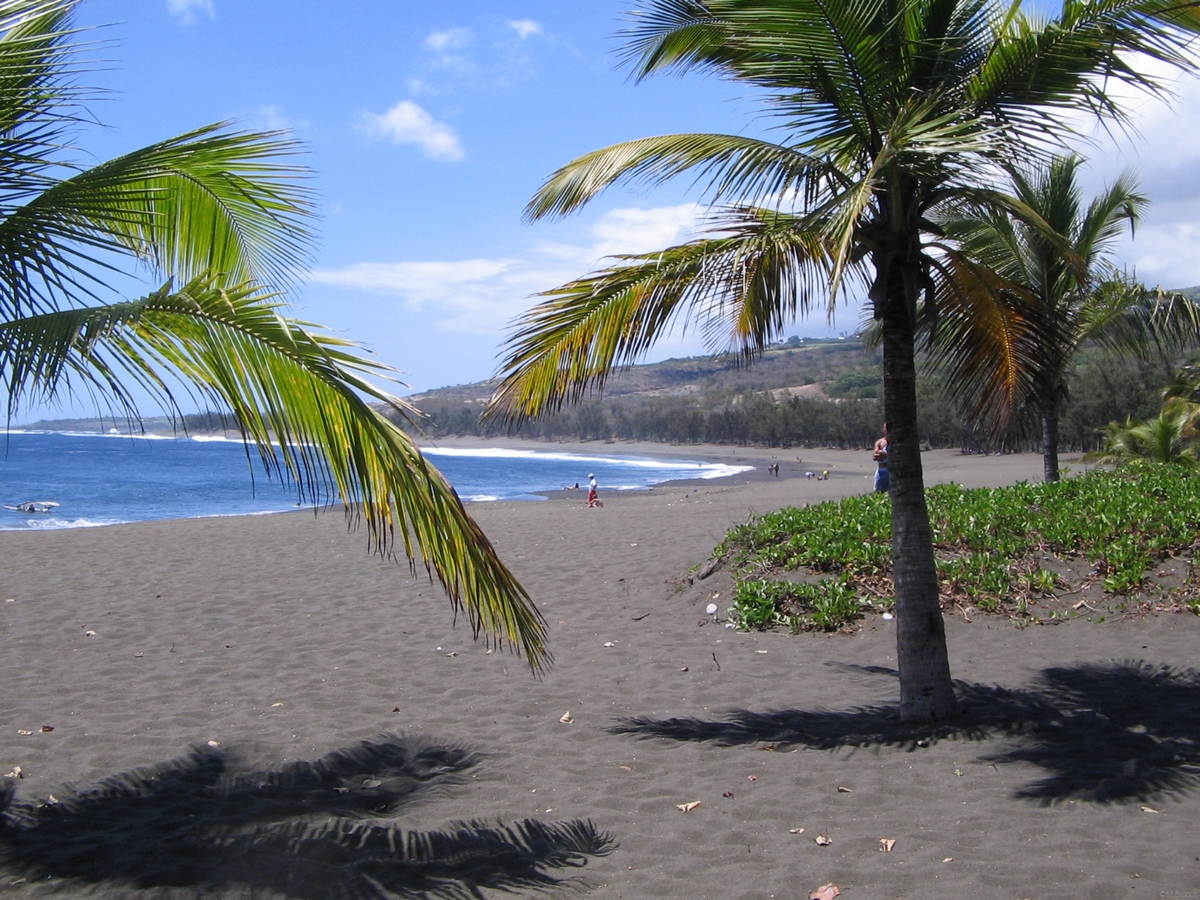
Beach of L'Étang-Salé

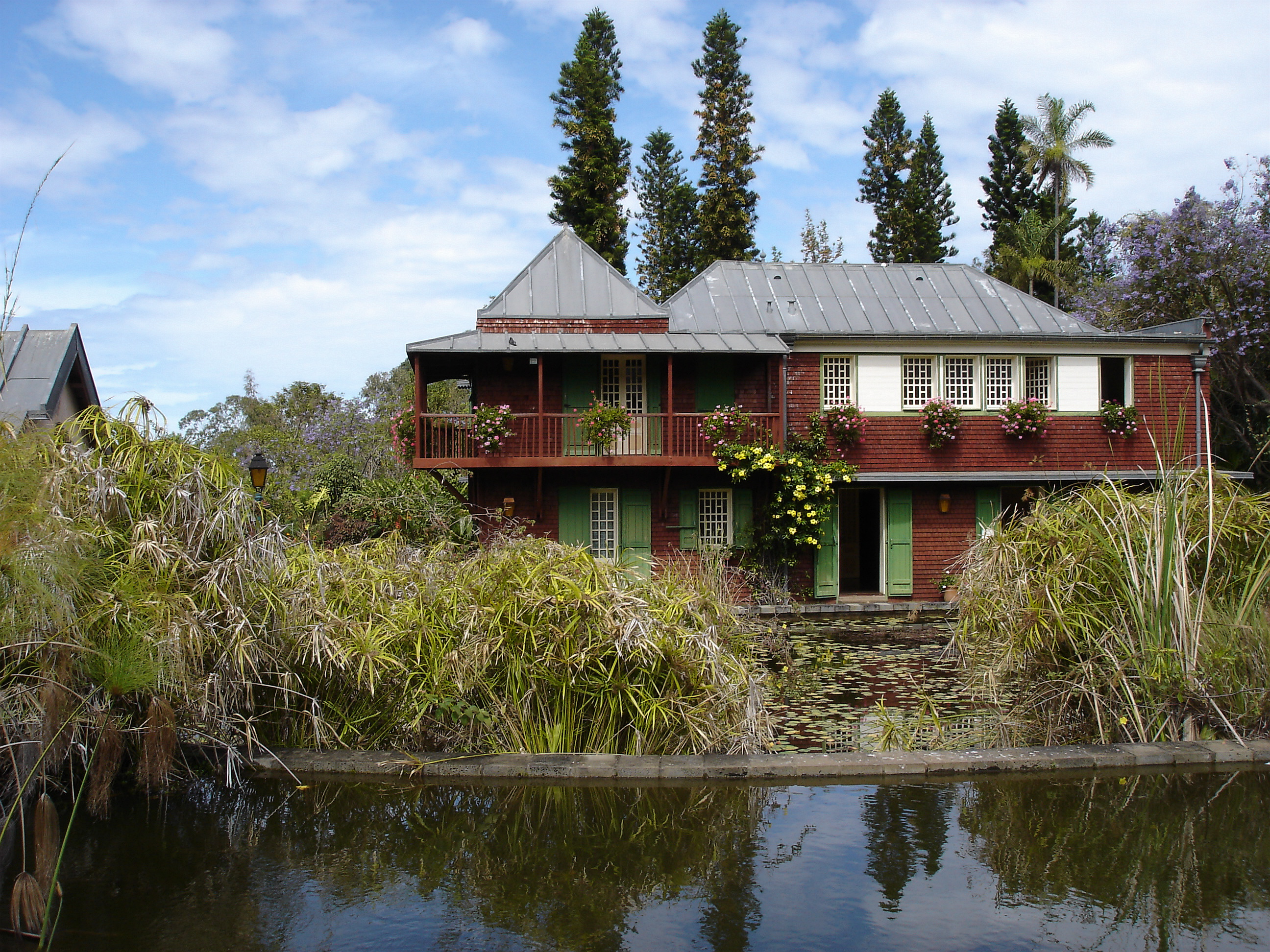
Conservatoire botanique national de Mascarin in Saint-Leu
