= Saint-Louis, Réunion =

Commune in Réunion, France

Saint-Louis
- Commune
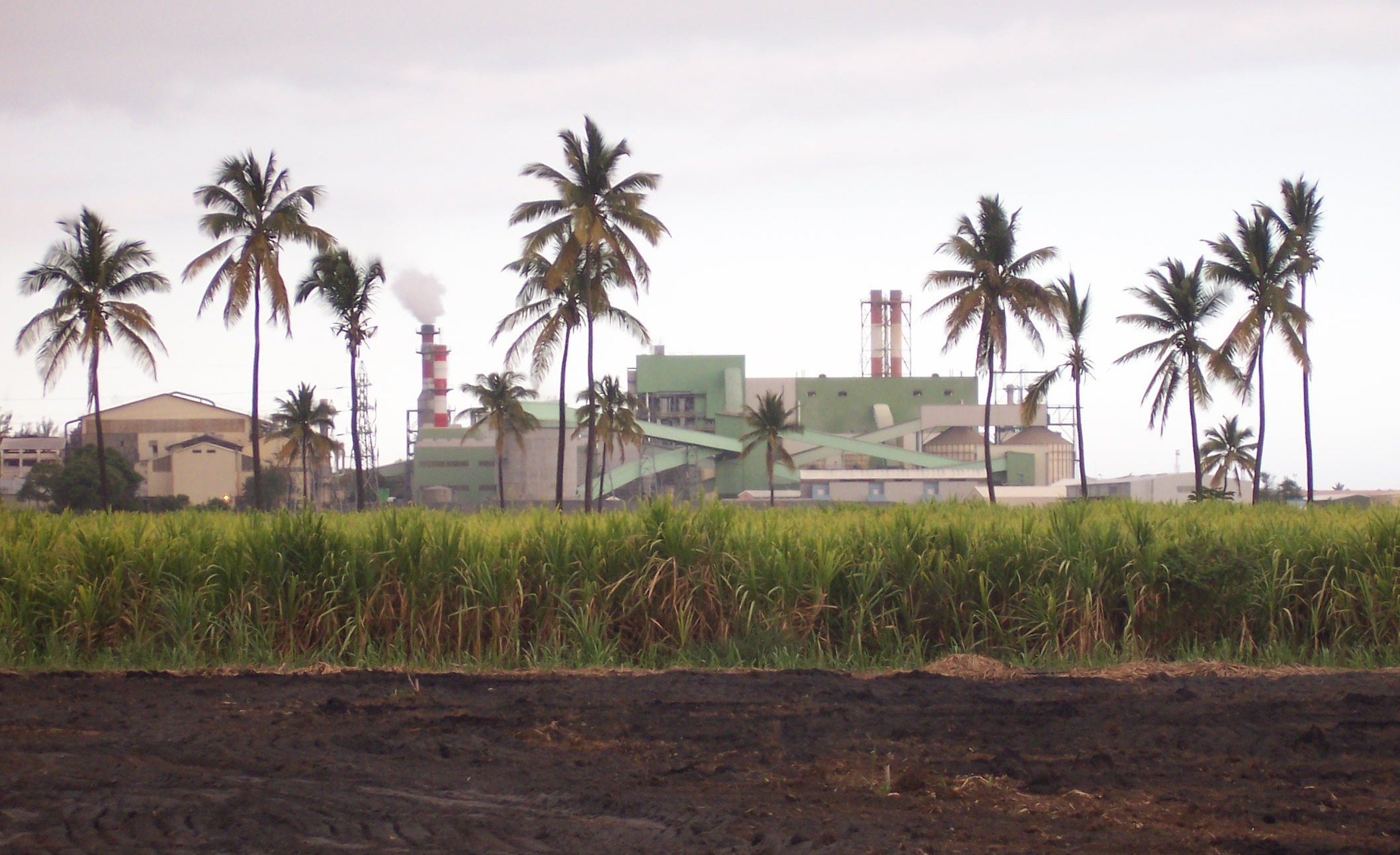
- The sugarcane factory and the bagasse/coal dual power plant of Gol, in Saint-Louis

- Coat of arms

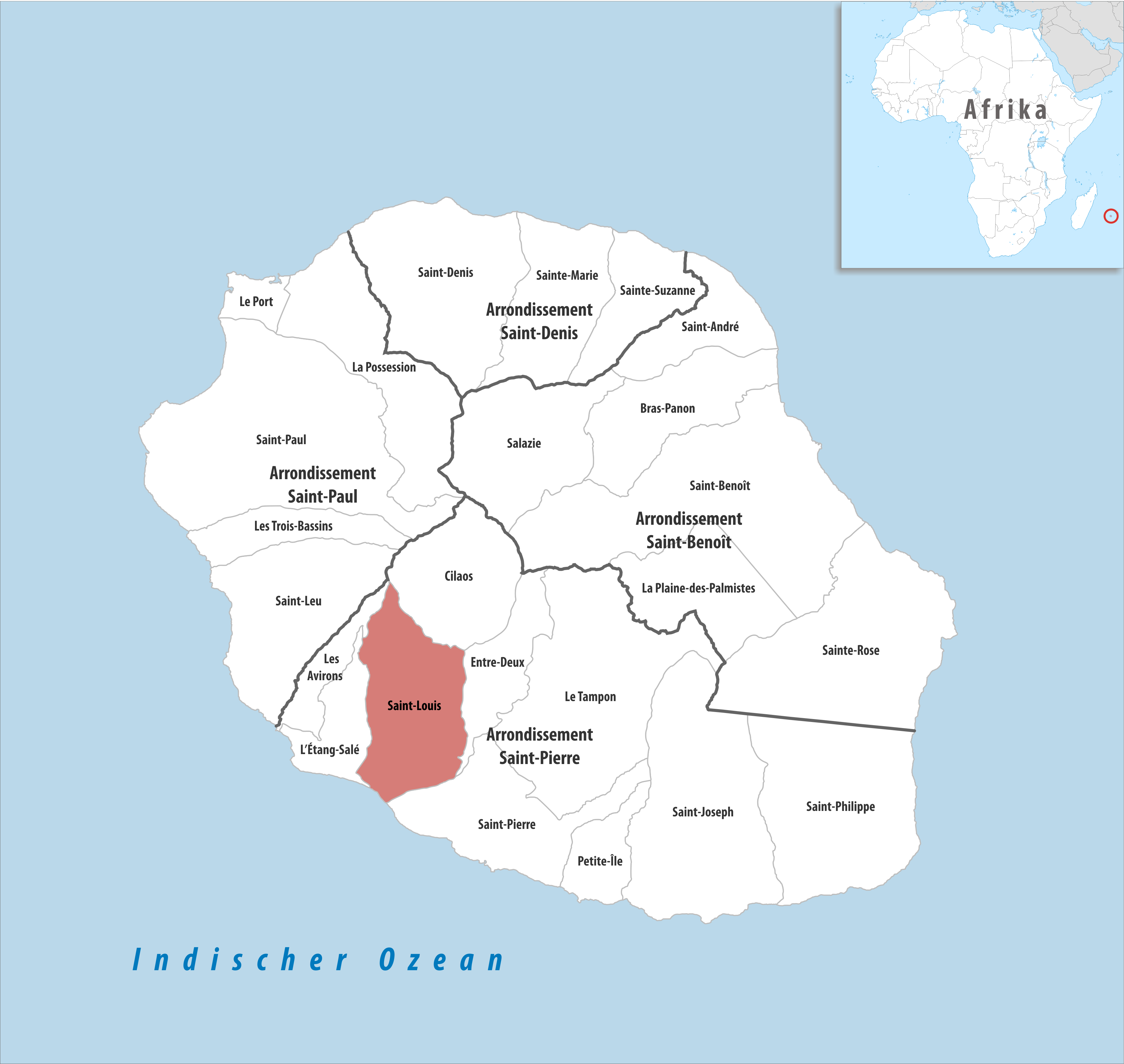
- Location of Saint-Louis
- Coordinates: 21°17′12″S 55°24′33″E
- Country: France
- Overseas region and department: Réunion
- Arrondissement: Saint-Pierre
- Canton: Saint-Louis-1 and 2
- Intercommunality: Villes solidaires

Government
  - Mayor (2020–2026): Juliana M'Doihoma
- Area^{1}: 98.90 km^{2} (38.19 sq mi)
- Elevation: 31 m (102 ft)
- Highest elevation: 2,543 m (8,343 ft)
- Lowest elevation: 0 m (0 ft)
- Population (2023): 54,941
  - Density: 555.5/km^{2} (1,439/sq mi)
- Time zone: UTC+04:00
- INSEE/Postal code: 97414 /97450
- ^{1} French Land Register data, which excludes lakes, ponds, glaciers > 1 km^{2} (0.386 sq mi or 247 acres) and river estuaries.

Saint-Louis (French pronunciation: [sɛ̃ lwi]; Reunionese Creole: Sin Loui) is the fifth-largest commune in the French overseas department of Réunion. It is located on the southwest part of the island of Réunion, adjacent to Saint-Pierre.

== Geography ==
=== Climate ===
Saint-Louis has a tropical savanna climate (Köppen climate classification Aw). The average annual temperature in Saint-Louis is 22.2 °C (72.0 °F). The average annual rainfall is 1,161.6 mm (45.73 in) with January as the wettest month. The temperatures are highest on average in February, at around 25.2 °C (77.4 °F), and lowest in July, at around 19.0 °C (66.2 °F). The highest temperature ever recorded in Saint-Louis was 34.6 °C (94.3 °F) on 11 February 2016; the coldest temperature ever recorded was 10.4 °C (50.7 °F) on 10 August 2020.

Climate data for Saint-Louis (1991−2020 normals, extremes 1997−present)
| Month | Jan | Feb | Mar | Apr | May | Jun | Jul | Aug | Sep | Oct | Nov | Dec | Year |
|---|---|---|---|---|---|---|---|---|---|---|---|---|---|
| Record high °C (°F) | 33.6 (92.5) | 34.6 (94.3) | 34.4 (93.9) | 31.7 (89.1) | 30.9 (87.6) | 29.4 (84.9) | 29.2 (84.6) | 27.4 (81.3) | 28.7 (83.7) | 30.0 (86.0) | 32.1 (89.8) | 33.2 (91.8) | 34.6 (94.3) |
| Mean daily maximum °C (°F) | 29.5 (85.1) | 29.6 (85.3) | 29.3 (84.7) | 28.1 (82.6) | 26.3 (79.3) | 24.5 (76.1) | 23.6 (74.5) | 24.0 (75.2) | 24.6 (76.3) | 25.8 (78.4) | 27.3 (81.1) | 28.7 (83.7) | 26.8 (80.2) |
| Daily mean °C (°F) | 25.1 (77.2) | 25.2 (77.4) | 24.8 (76.6) | 23.6 (74.5) | 21.8 (71.2) | 20.0 (68.0) | 19.0 (66.2) | 19.2 (66.6) | 19.8 (67.6) | 21.0 (69.8) | 22.5 (72.5) | 24.1 (75.4) | 22.2 (72.0) |
| Mean daily minimum °C (°F) | 20.7 (69.3) | 20.9 (69.6) | 20.3 (68.5) | 19.1 (66.4) | 17.3 (63.1) | 15.4 (59.7) | 14.5 (58.1) | 14.4 (57.9) | 15.0 (59.0) | 16.3 (61.3) | 17.8 (64.0) | 19.5 (67.1) | 17.6 (63.7) |
| Record low °C (°F) | 17.0 (62.6) | 17.6 (63.7) | 16.4 (61.5) | 14.9 (58.8) | 12.8 (55.0) | 11.3 (52.3) | 10.7 (51.3) | 10.4 (50.7) | 11.3 (52.3) | 11.8 (53.2) | 13.6 (56.5) | 16.1 (61.0) | 10.4 (50.7) |
| Average precipitation mm (inches) | 254.4 (10.02) | 192.9 (7.59) | 139.2 (5.48) | 117.4 (4.62) | 64.5 (2.54) | 49.6 (1.95) | 58.7 (2.31) | 26.9 (1.06) | 38.6 (1.52) | 35.2 (1.39) | 63.1 (2.48) | 121.1 (4.77) | 1,161.6 (45.73) |
| Average precipitation days (≥ 1.0 mm) | 11.5 | 10.6 | 8.4 | 6.8 | 6.0 | 4.7 | 4.7 | 2.6 | 3.3 | 3.6 | 4.7 | 8.2 | 75.1 |
Source: Météo-France

Climate data for Saint-Louis (Plaine des Makes, altitude 980m, 1991–2020 normals, extremes 1969–present)
| Month | Jan | Feb | Mar | Apr | May | Jun | Jul | Aug | Sep | Oct | Nov | Dec | Year |
|---|---|---|---|---|---|---|---|---|---|---|---|---|---|
| Record high °C (°F) | 29.5 (85.1) | 30.7 (87.3) | 28.7 (83.7) | 26.6 (79.9) | 25.6 (78.1) | 26.5 (79.7) | 23.8 (74.8) | 25.5 (77.9) | 24.0 (75.2) | 26.7 (80.1) | 26.9 (80.4) | 29.4 (84.9) | 30.7 (87.3) |
| Mean daily maximum °C (°F) | 24.8 (76.6) | 24.9 (76.8) | 24.5 (76.1) | 23.3 (73.9) | 21.4 (70.5) | 19.8 (67.6) | 18.6 (65.5) | 18.8 (65.8) | 19.4 (66.9) | 20.8 (69.4) | 22.4 (72.3) | 24.1 (75.4) | 21.9 (71.4) |
| Daily mean °C (°F) | 21.0 (69.8) | 21.1 (70.0) | 20.7 (69.3) | 19.5 (67.1) | 17.5 (63.5) | 15.8 (60.4) | 14.7 (58.5) | 14.7 (58.5) | 15.2 (59.4) | 16.6 (61.9) | 18.2 (64.8) | 19.9 (67.8) | 17.9 (64.2) |
| Mean daily minimum °C (°F) | 17.1 (62.8) | 17.4 (63.3) | 16.9 (62.4) | 15.7 (60.3) | 13.6 (56.5) | 11.8 (53.2) | 10.8 (51.4) | 10.6 (51.1) | 11.0 (51.8) | 12.5 (54.5) | 14.0 (57.2) | 15.7 (60.3) | 13.9 (57.0) |
| Record low °C (°F) | 11.8 (53.2) | 13.0 (55.4) | 11.7 (53.1) | 10.0 (50.0) | 9.0 (48.2) | 7.7 (45.9) | 6.5 (43.7) | 6.9 (44.4) | 6.9 (44.4) | 6.1 (43.0) | 8.9 (48.0) | 12.2 (54.0) | 6.1 (43.0) |
| Average precipitation mm (inches) | 369.6 (14.55) | 351.7 (13.85) | 244.7 (9.63) | 158.1 (6.22) | 82.6 (3.25) | 97.7 (3.85) | 96.7 (3.81) | 51.9 (2.04) | 60.6 (2.39) | 63.7 (2.51) | 76.2 (3.00) | 190.1 (7.48) | 1,843.6 (72.58) |
| Average precipitation days (≥ 1.0 mm) | 15.9 | 15.1 | 13.2 | 10.1 | 7.1 | 6.6 | 6.3 | 4.5 | 5.1 | 6.3 | 8.3 | 12.6 | 111.1 |
Source: Météo-France

== Population ==
Historical population
| Year | Pop. | ±% p.a. |
|---|---|---|
| 1961 | 23,998 | — |
| 1967 | 26,663 | +1.77% |
| 1974 | 30,291 | +1.84% |
| 1982 | 31,785 | +0.60% |
| 1990 | 37,420 | +2.06% |
| 1999 | 43,519 | +1.69% |
| 2007 | 50,131 | +1.78% |
| 2012 | 52,614 | +0.97% |
| 2017 | 53,365 | +0.28% |
| 2023 | 54,941 | +0.49% |
Source: SPLAF and INSEE (1967-2023)

== See also ==
- Communes of the Réunion department
