= Rue de Rome =

Rue de Rome is the name of a number of streets:

== Canada ==
- Rue de Rome (Montreal), in Montreal

== Belgium ==
- Rue de Rome (Brussels), in Brussels

== France ==
- Rue de Rome (Marseille), in Marseille
- Rue de Rome (Paris), in Paris
- Rue de Rome (Tampon), in Le Tampon, Réunion

== Tunisia ==
- Rue de Rome (Tunis), in Tunis
