= 1988–89 South-West Indian Ocean cyclone season =

Cyclone season in the Southwest Indian Ocean

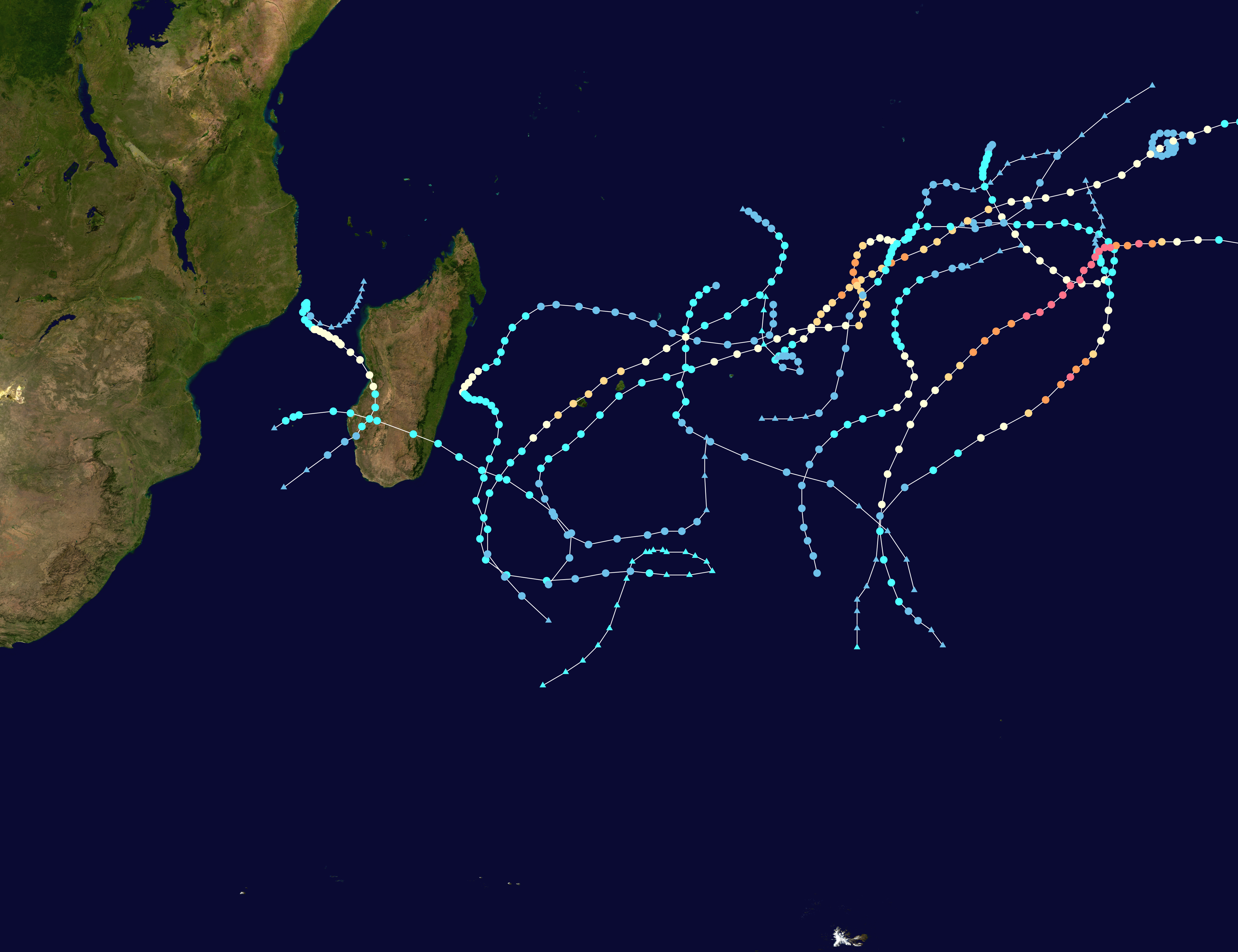
- Season summary map

Seasonal boundaries
- First system formed: November 1, 1988
- Last system dissipated: April 11, 1989

Strongest storm
- Name: Hanitra and Krisy
  - Maximum winds: 150 km/h (95 mph) (10-minute sustained)
  - Lowest pressure: 940 hPa (mbar)

Seasonal statistics
- Total disturbances: 12
- Total depressions: 12
- Total storms: 11
- Tropical cyclones: 6
- Total fatalities: 11
- Total damage: $217 million (1989 USD)

Related articles
- 1988–89 Australian region cyclone season; 1988–89 South Pacific cyclone season

The 1988–89 South-West Indian Ocean cyclone season was an active season that featured several storms moving near or over the Mascarene Islands or Madagascar. The eleven tropical storms was two greater than average, of which five became tropical cyclones – a storm with maximum sustained winds over 10 minutes of 120 km/h (75 mph) or greater. Storms were monitored by the Météo-France office (MFR) on Réunion island in an official capacity, as well as the American Joint Typhoon Warning Center (JTWC) on an unofficial base. The season began early with Moderate Tropical Storm Adelinina forming in early November, and continued through the middle of April. Adelinina was one of two storms to form in November, the other being Tropical Cyclone Barisaona which crossed from the adjacent Australian basin.

After no activity in December, there were four storms in January, including the most notable of the season – Cyclone Firinga. The storm caused ₣1 billion (1989 francs, $157 million 1989 USD) in damage when it struck Réunion. Tropical Cyclone Calasanjy also formed in the month, causing heavy damage when it struck western Madagascar. Three storms formed in February, the second of which, Hanitra, also crossed from the Australian basin. This storm, as well as later Tropical Cyclone Krisy, were the strongest of the season, attaining peak 10‑minute winds of 150 km/h (93 mph). Tropical Cyclone Jinabo was the first of three storms to form in quick succession in late March, the others being Krisy and Tropical Storm Lezissy. Jinabo originated off the east coast of Madagascar and dropped heavy rainfall on Réunion. Krisy took a similar track and passed within 100 km (62 mi) of Rodrigues and Mauritius, causing heavy crop damage. Lastly, Tropical Storm Lezissy merged with Krisy and dissipated on April 11 to end the season.

== Seasonal summary ==
During the season, the Météo-France office (MFR) on Réunion island issued warnings in tropical cyclones within the basin. Using satellite imagery from National Oceanic and Atmospheric Administration, the agency estimated intensity through the Dvorak technique, and warned on tropical cyclones in the region from the coast of Africa to 90° E, south of the equator. At the time, the World Meteorological Organization recognized the MFR as a Regional Tropical Cyclone Advisory Centre, and would later label the agency as a Regional Specialized Meteorological Center in 1993. The Joint Typhoon Warning Center (JTWC), which is a joint United States Navy – United States Air Force task force, also issued tropical cyclone warnings for the southwestern Indian Ocean. The season's 11 named storms is slightly above the long term average, while the five tropical cyclones – a storm attaining maximum sustained winds of at least 120 km/h (75 mph) – was the same as the long term average. There was an ongoing La Niña event in the middle of the season. The MFR considered the tropical cyclone year to begin on August 1 and continue to July 31 of the following year.

In addition to the storms monitored by the MFR, the JTWC tracked a storm in March that formed off the west coast of Madagascar on March 7. It moved generally to the south or south-southeast, failing to intensify beyond 1‑minute winds of 65 km/h (40 mph). After passing west of Madagascar, the storm dissipated on March 11.

== Systems ==
=== Moderate Tropical Storm Adelinina ===
- Moderate tropical storm (MFR)
- Category 1 tropical cyclone (SSHWS)
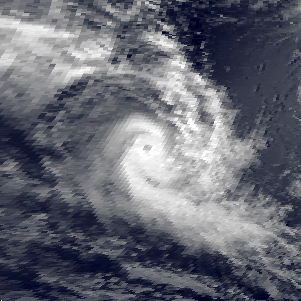
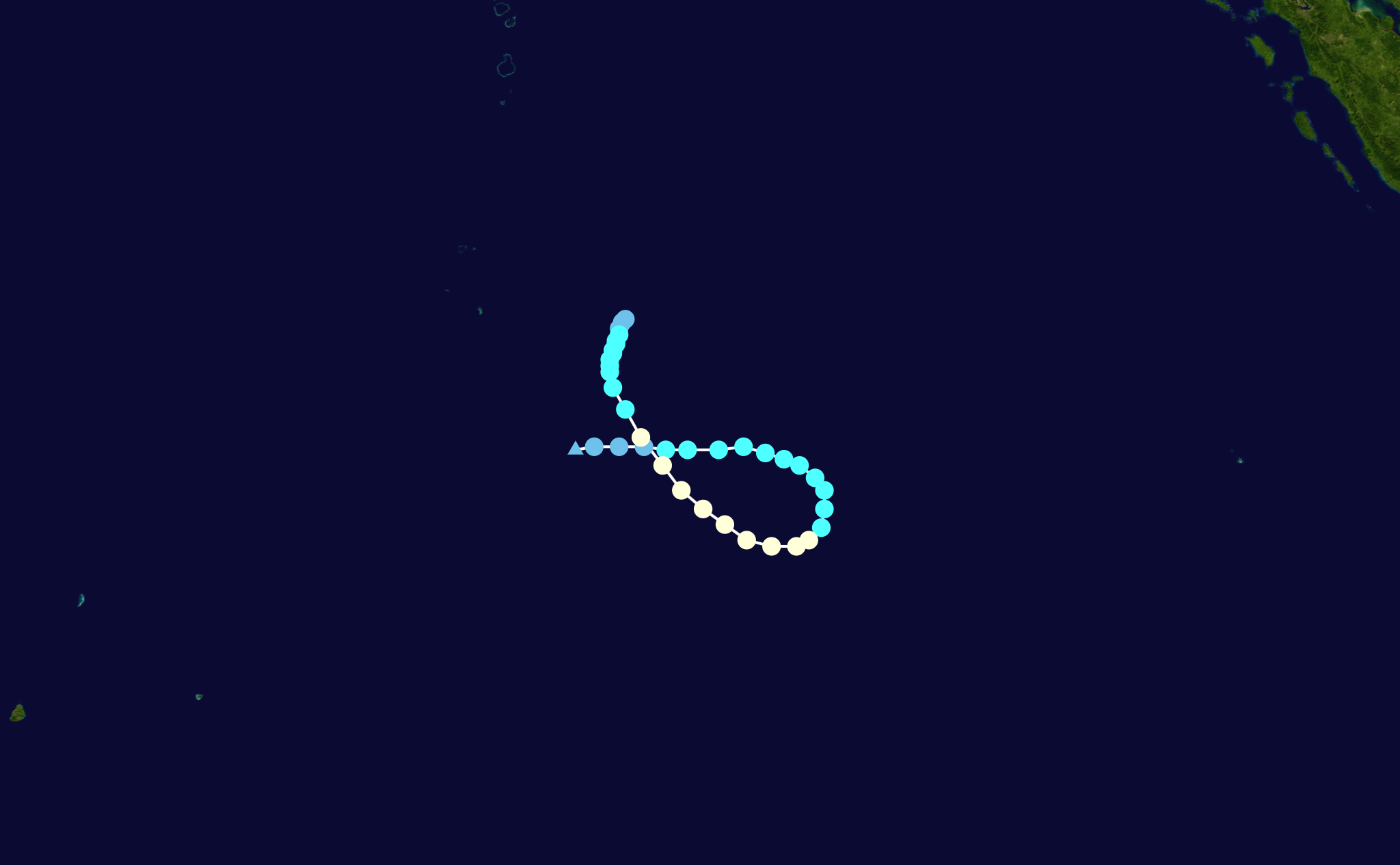
- Duration: November 1 – November 8
- Peak intensity: 80 km/h (50 mph) (10-min); 984 hPa (mbar)

The Intertropical Convergence Zone (ITCZ) over the eastern Indian Ocean was the origin of what would become Tropical Storm Adelinina. On October 30, the JTWC began monitoring the system to the south of Diego Garcia, and classified it as Tropical Cyclone 01S on November 1. On the next day, the MFR began issuing advisories on the system and quickly upgraded it to Moderate Tropical Storm Adelinina. The agency estimated 10‑minute winds of 80 km/h (50 mph) as the storm moved to the southeast. By contrast, the JTWC assessed that Adelinina rapidly intensified into the equivalent of a minimal hurricane on November 2, estimating peak 1‑minute winds of 140 km/h (85 mph) the next day. Without strengthening further, Adelinina began weakening on November 4, turning to the east and later turning back to the northwest; the track was influenced by a ridge to the south. Adelinina completed its five-day loop on November 7 as it crossed westward over its former track. That day, the MFR re-upgraded the system to tropical storm status, but discontinued advisories on November 8.

=== Tropical Cyclone Barisaona ===
- Tropical cyclone (MFR)
- Category 3 tropical cyclone (SSHWS)
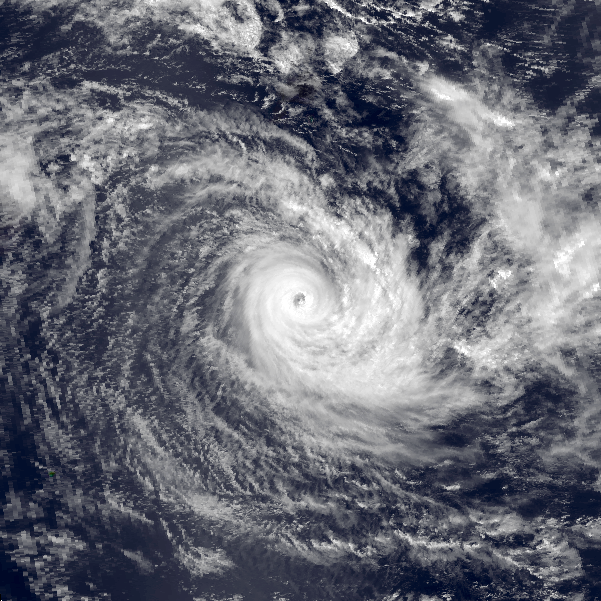
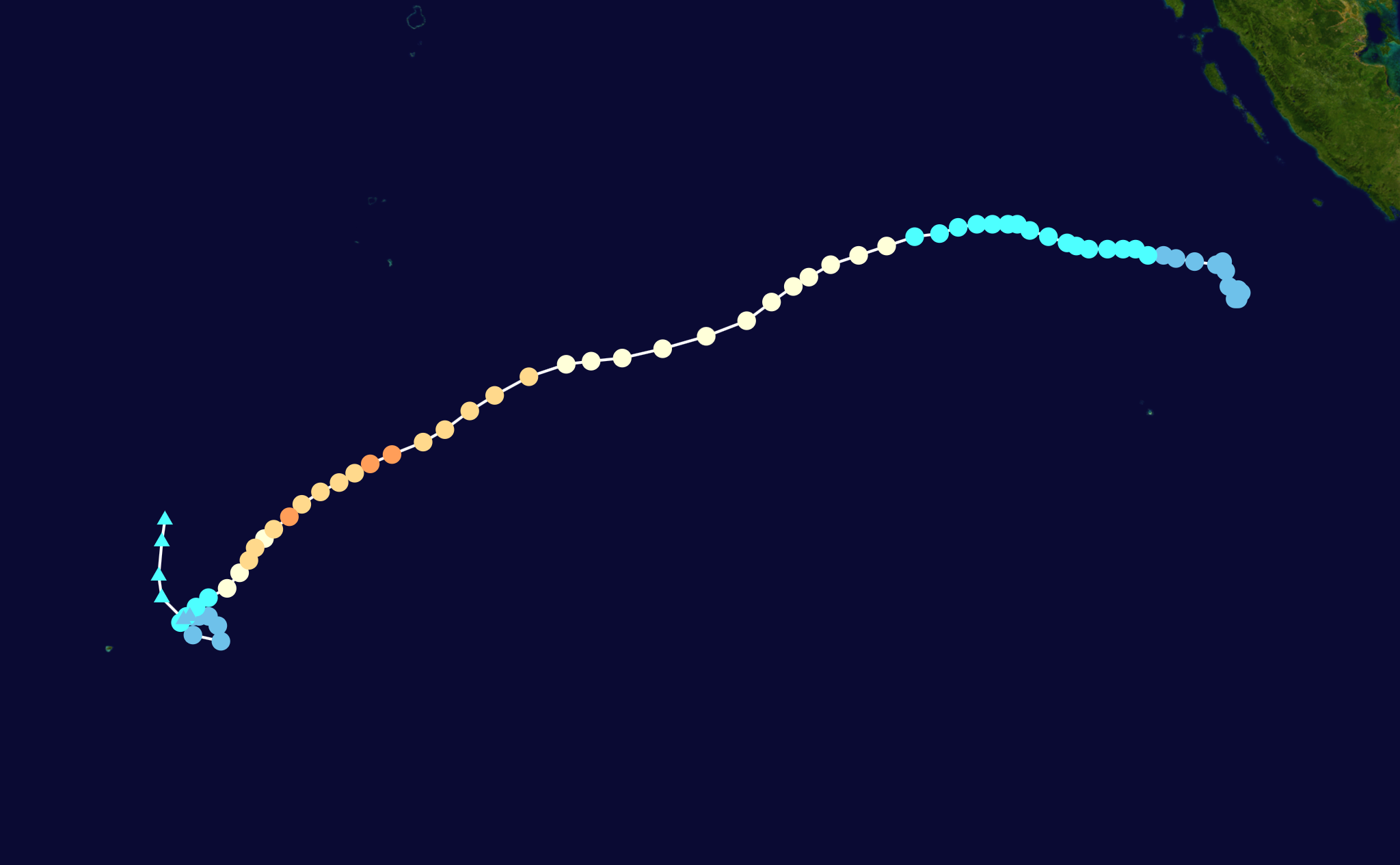
- Duration: November 12 (Entered basin) – November 23
- Peak intensity: 135 km/h (85 mph) (10-min); 954 hPa (mbar)

On November 5, a tropical depression formed in the Australian basin south of Indonesia from a trough. It moved slowly and erratically to the west, only gradually organizing. On November 8, the JTWC classified the system as Tropical Cyclone 02S. Before entering the south-west Indian Ocean, the Bureau of Meteorology (BoM) estimated that the system reached 10‑minute winds of 105 km/h (65 mph). However, the BoM did not include the system in its annual summary of the season, and at the time it was considered a tropical depression in the Australian region. On November 12, the system crossed 90° E, classified as Moderate Tropical Storm Barisaona by the MFR. By that time, the storm was moving steadily to the west-southwest, steered by a ridge to the south, and it attained tropical cyclone status two days later. Also on November 14, the MFR estimated peak 10‑minute winds of 135 km/h (84 mph), based on the well-defined eye. Barisaona briefly weakened to tropical storm status on November 15, only to regain tropical cyclone status the next day. On November 16, the JTWC estimated peak 1‑minute winds of 185 km/h (115 mph). A passing trough turned the cyclone to the southwest. It gradually weakened thereafter, and JTWC discontinued advisories on November 20. The MFR tracked Barisaona for a few more days as a ridge steered the system back to the north; the system dissipated on November 23.

=== Tropical Cyclone Calasanjy ===
- Tropical cyclone (MFR)
- Category 1 tropical cyclone (SSHWS)
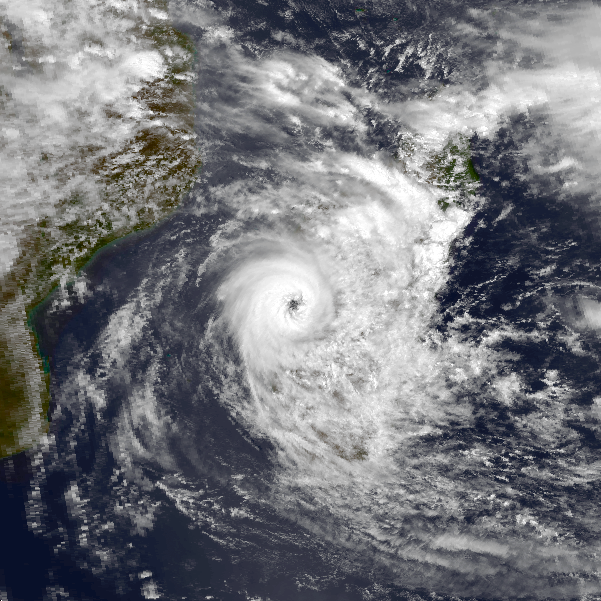
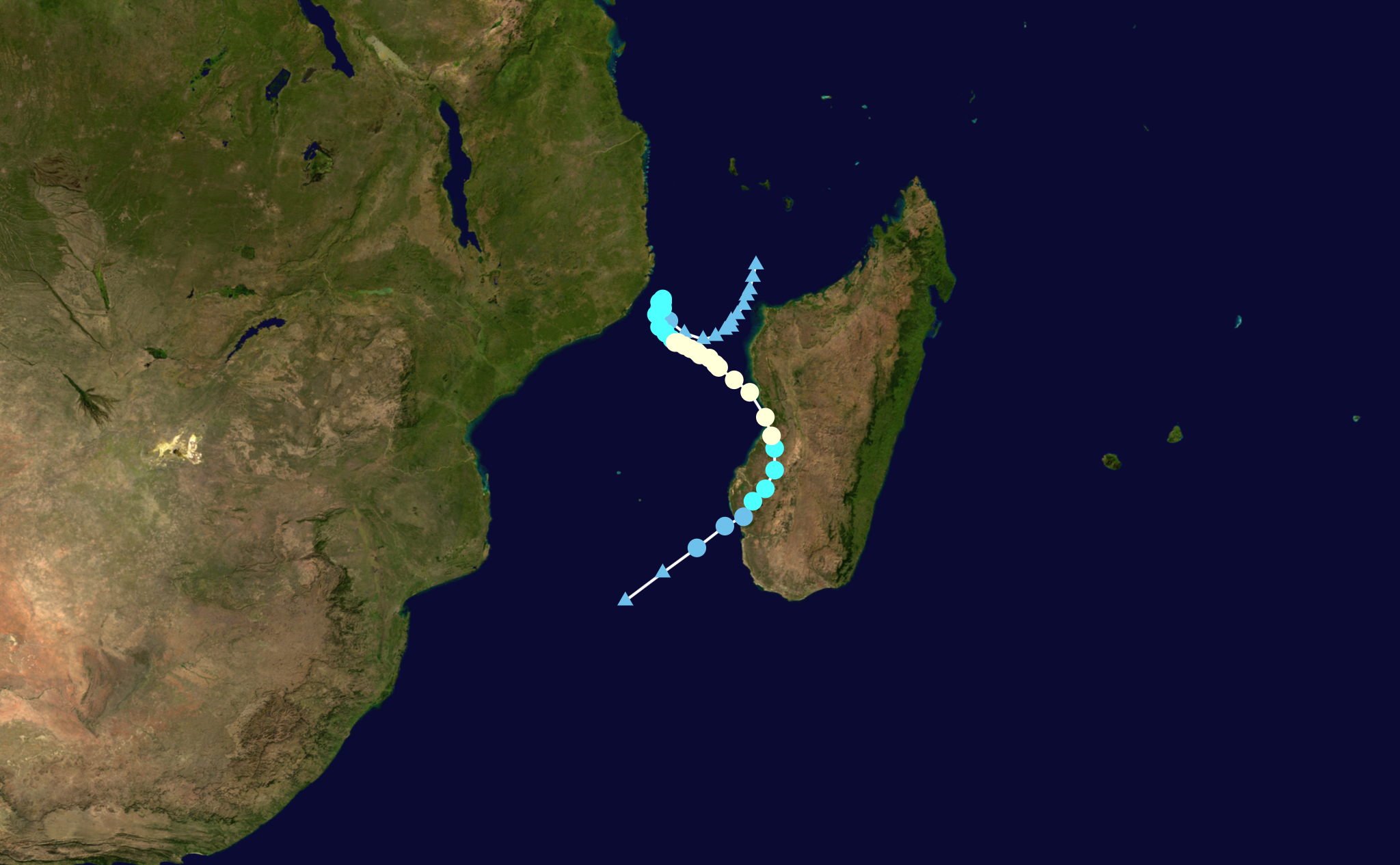
- Duration: January 6 – January 15
- Peak intensity: 135 km/h (85 mph) (10-min); 955 hPa (mbar)

The origins of Calasanjy were from the ITCZ in the Mozambique Channel off the northwest coast of Madagascar in early January. An area of disturbed weather moved southwestward at first, but gradually curved to the northwest. On January 9, the MFR classified it as a tropical disturbance, but upgraded it to Moderate Tropical Storm Calasanjy on the next day. Also on January 10, the JTWC designated the storm as Tropical Cyclone 06S. By that time, Calasanjy was just off the east coast of Mozambique, although it executed a tight loop to the southeast spare a landfall. Moving along its former path, the storm gradually intensified – the JTWC upgraded it to the equivalent of a minimal hurricane on January 12, and the MFR upgraded Calasanjy to tropical cyclone status two days later. Both agencies estimated peak winds of around 135 km/h (84 mph). Later on January 14, Calasanjy made landfall in western Madagascar near Morondava, and soon after moving ashore it turned to the southwest, its motion changed due to a ridge to the southeast. It weakened to tropical depression status before re-emerging into the Mozambique Channel on January 16, becoming extratropical the next day.

Cyclone Calasanjy caused heavy damage in western Madagascar, with a peak wind gust of 195 km/h (121 mph) in Maintirano. The storm caused the Morondava River to increase to a flow rate of 2,702 m^{3}/s (95,420 ft^{3}/s), with a peak height of 4.08 m (13.4 ft) during the storm. Reforms enacted after previous cyclones Kamisy and Honorinina helped facilitate repairs following this storm.

=== Tropical Depression Dona ===
- Tropical depression (MFR)
- Tropical storm (SSHWS)
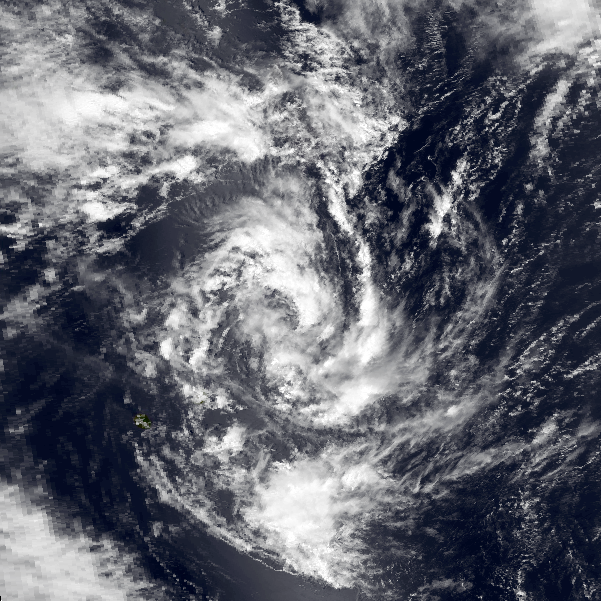
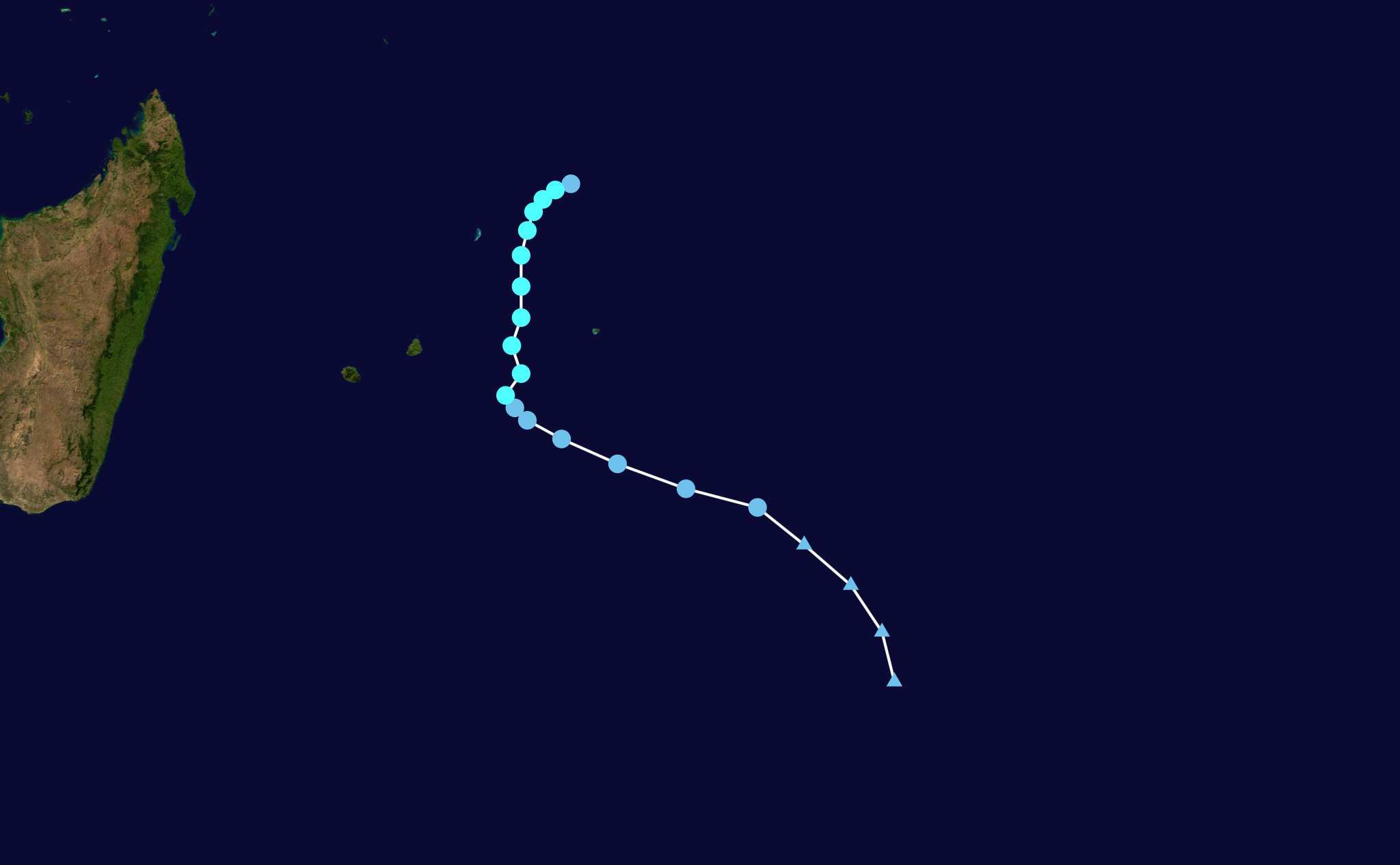
- Duration: January 10 – January 14
- Peak intensity: 50 km/h (30 mph) (10-min); 997 hPa (mbar)

On January 10, a tropical disturbance formed east-northeast of St. Brandon, which is a small archipelago belonging to Mauritius. It originally consisted of a small, weak vortex, although it gradually organized. The system moved to the southwest and quickly intensified into a tropical depression, reaching peak winds of 50 km/h (31 mph). Despite it only being a depression, the Mauritius Meteorological Service named the depression Dona due to the threat to the island. The system turned more to the south ahead of a trough, passing east of St. Brandon and later to the west of Rodrigues. Later, Dona turned to the southeast, dissipating on January 14 without affecting land.

=== Tropical Cyclone Edme ===
- Tropical cyclone (MFR)
- Category 4 tropical cyclone (SSHWS)
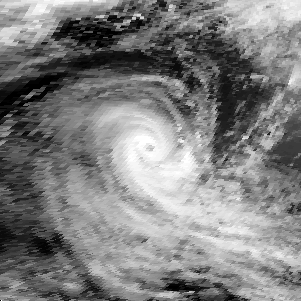
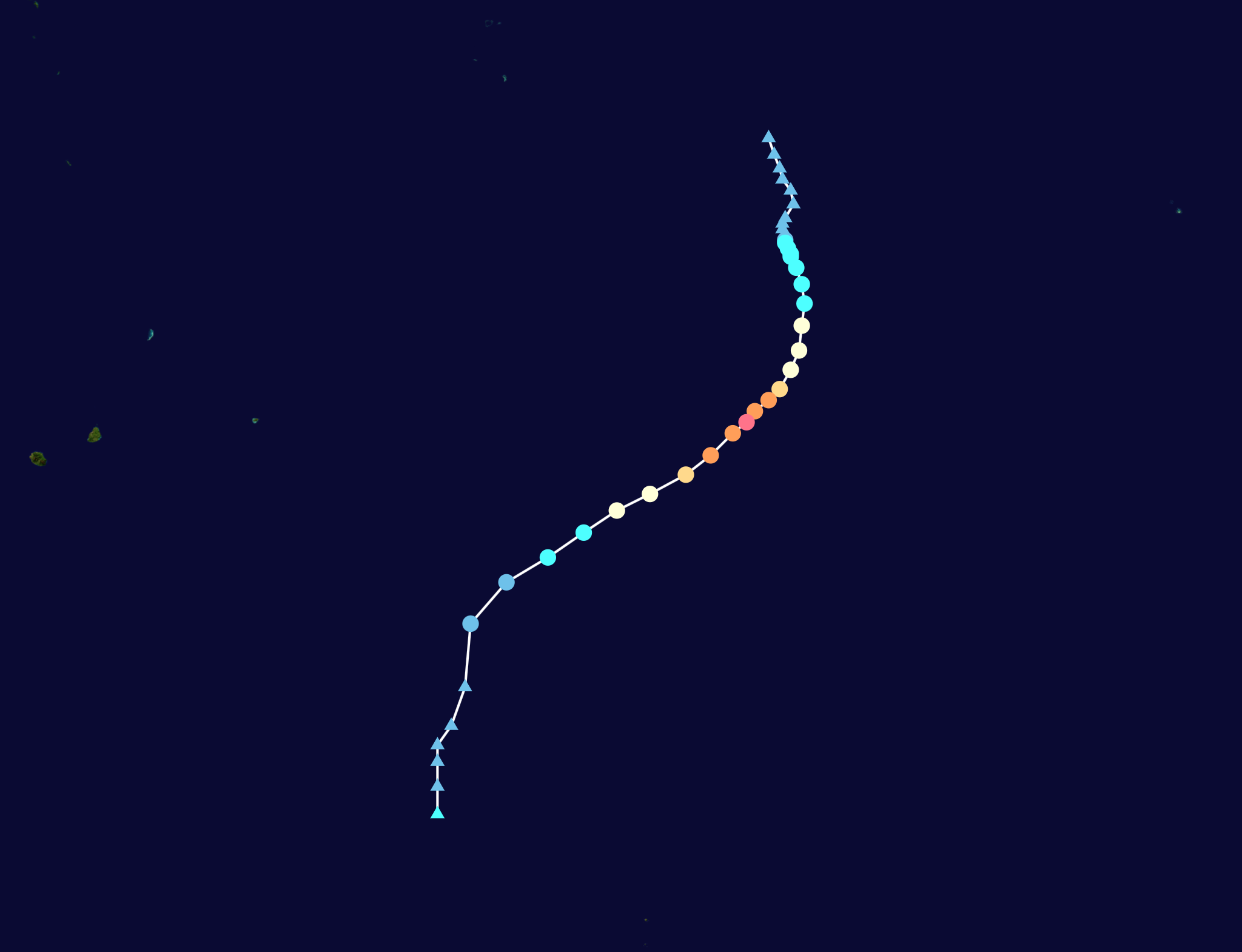
- Duration: January 20 – January 27
- Peak intensity: 120 km/h (75 mph) (10-min); 966 hPa (mbar)

On January 20, a tropical disturbance formed about 240 km (150 mi) west of the Cocos Islands. That day, the JTWC classified it as Tropical Cyclone 07S, although it had monitored the system for the preceding three days. The nascent disturbance moved to the south and gradually intensified, becoming Moderate Tropical Storm Edme on January 21. On the next day, the JTWC upgraded the storm to the equivalent of a minimal hurricane, as Edme was aided by favorable upper-level conditions beneath an anticyclone. On January 23, the agency estimated peak 1‑minute winds of 215 km/h (134 mph); however, the MFR only assessed peak 10‑minute winds of 120 km/h (75 mph). By the time of peak intensity, Edme had begun moving southwestward and thereafter weakened due to increasing wind shear, imparted by a trough in the Westerlies. On January 26, the storm weakened to tropical depression status as it turned to the south. Edme dissipated the following day.

=== Tropical Cyclone Firinga ===
- Tropical cyclone (MFR)
- Category 2 tropical cyclone (SSHWS)
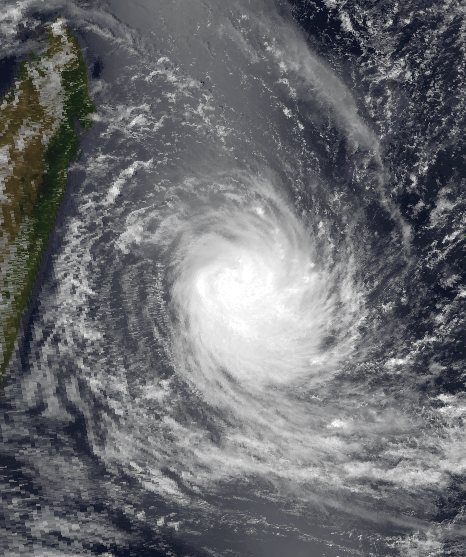
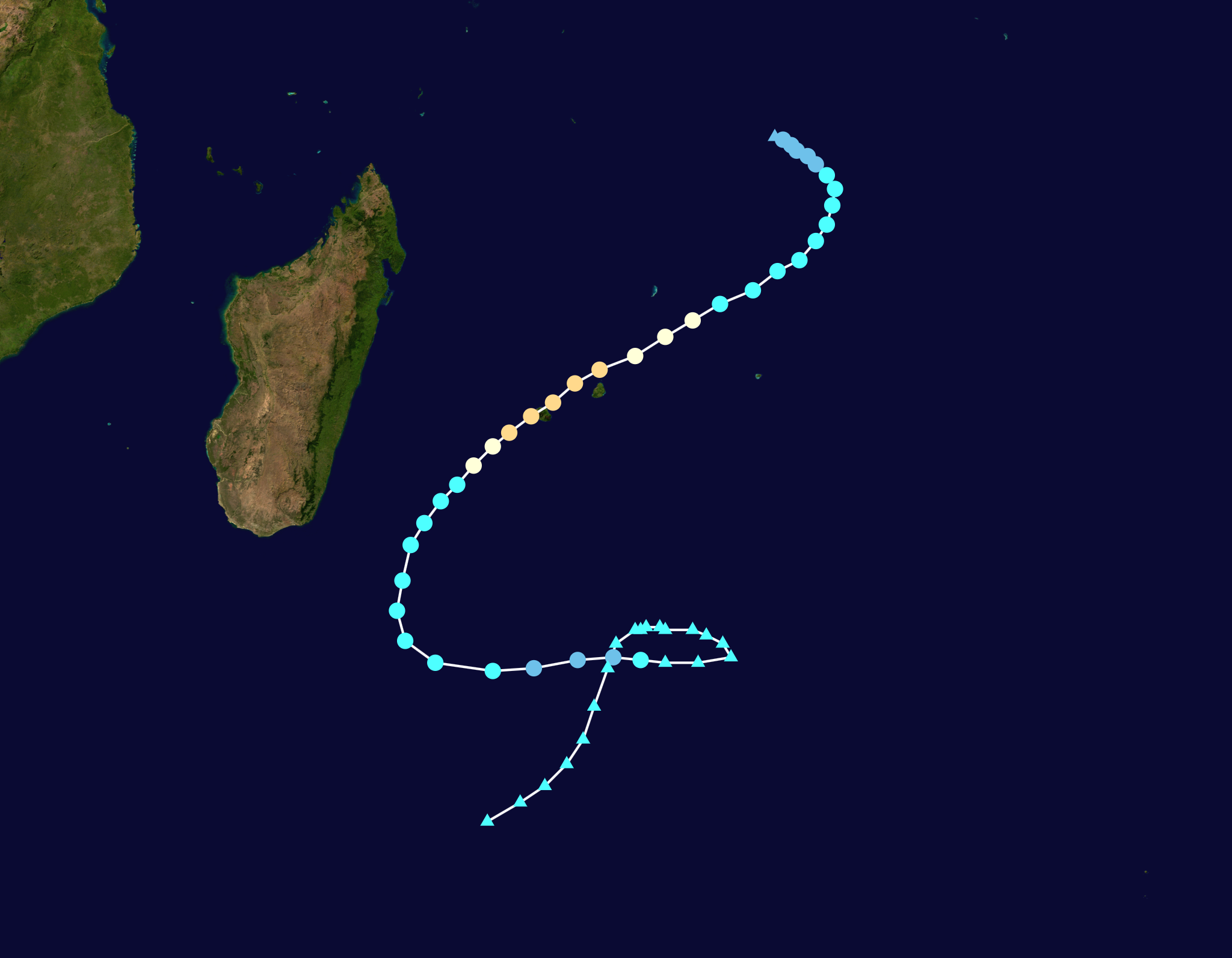
- Duration: January 24 – February 1
- Peak intensity: 135 km/h (85 mph) (10-min); 954 hPa (mbar)

Firinga developed on January 24 well to the northeast of Mauritius. After initially moving to the southeast, it began a southwest motion that it would continue for several days. During that time, the system intensified into Moderate Tropical Storm Firinga, and the JTWC upgraded it to the equivalent of a minimal hurricane on January 28. Early the next day, it intensified to tropical cyclone status, reaching peak winds of 135 km/h (84 mph). Around that time, Firinga passed 50 km (31 mi) west of Mauritius, producing 190 km/h (120 mph) wind gusts. Shortly thereafter, the cyclone struck Réunion, still at peak intensity, producing wind gusts as strong as 216 km/h (134 mph). Firinga turned more to the south as it weakened, degenerating into a tropical disturbance on January 31. It fluctuated in intensity after turning to the southeast and executing a loop to the southwest, dissipating on February 7.

On Mauritius, Firinga destroyed 844 homes. Heavy crop damage occurred on the island, and damage nationwide was estimated at $60 million (1989 USD). One person was killed in Mauritius. The storm dropped torrential rainfall in the southern portion of Réunion, including 24‑hour totals of 1,309 mm (51.5 in) at Pas de Bellecombe and 1,199 mm (47.2 in) at Casabois, both of which set records for the locations. The rains caused widespread river flooding and resulted in 32 mudslides. Firinga isolated several towns from the flooding and left power and water outages. A total of 2,746 houses were damaged or destroyed, leaving 6,200 people homeless. Damage was estimated at ₣1 billion (1989 francs, $157 million 1989 USD), and there were 10 deaths on the island.

=== Severe Tropical Storm Gizela ===
- Severe tropical storm (MFR)
- Category 1 tropical cyclone (SSHWS)
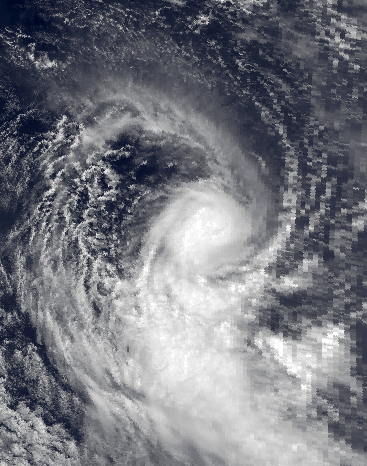
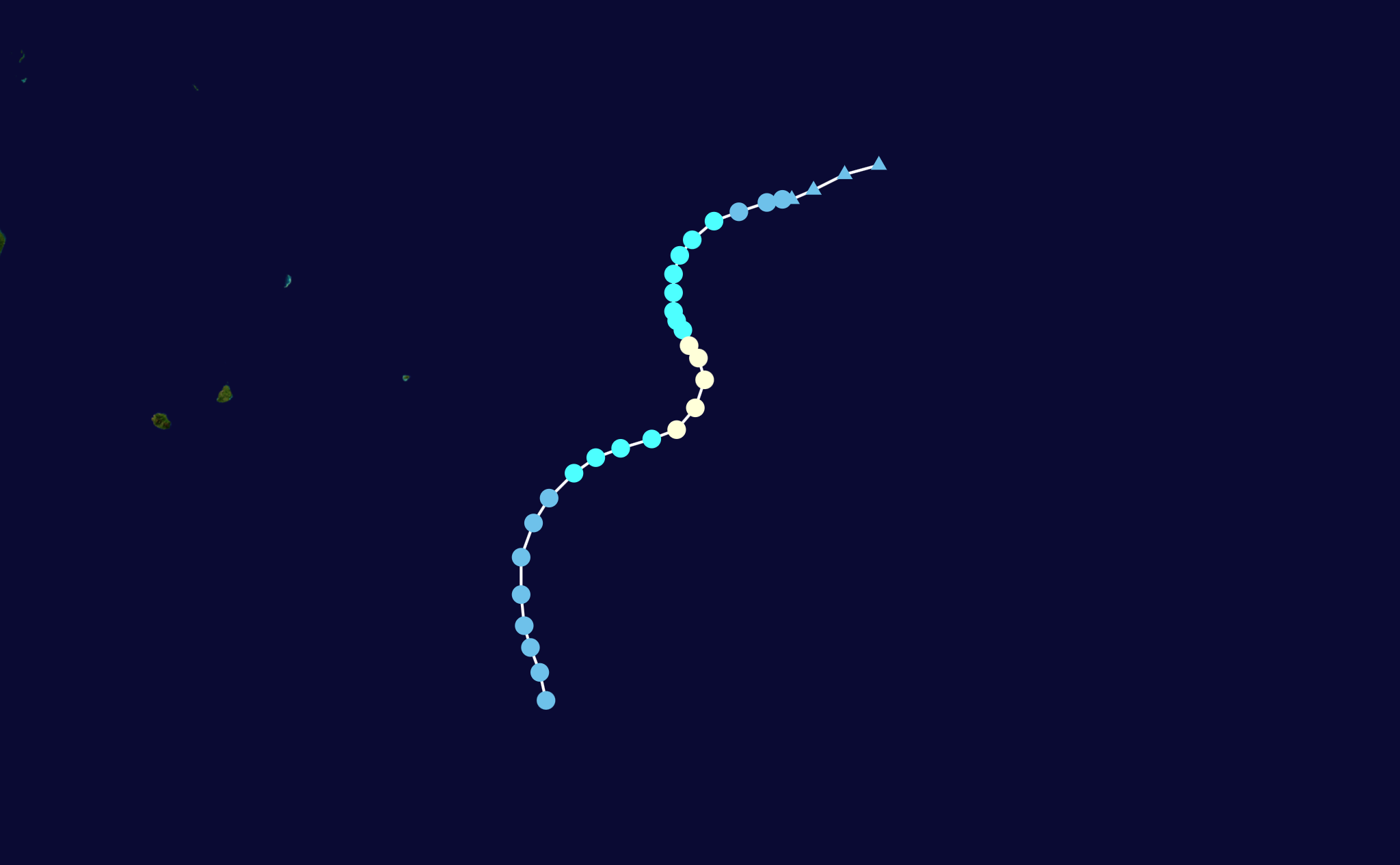
- Duration: February 16 – February 22
- Peak intensity: 95 km/h (60 mph) (10-min); 975 hPa (mbar)

A tropical disturbance formed on February 16 to the southeast of Diego Garcia. It moved to the west-southwest, intensifying into Moderate Tropical Storm Gizela on February 18. That day, the JTWC began classifying it as Tropical Cyclone 12S. Due to a passing trough, Gizela turned to the south and southeast, gradually strengthening. On February 20, the MFR estimated peak 10‑minute winds of 95 km/h (59 mph), while the JTWC upgraded it to the equivalent of a minimal hurricane. Influenced by a ridge, Gizela turned back to the southwest and slowly weakened while remaining far away from any landmasses. On February 22, it weakened to tropical depression status while turning to the south, and Gizela dissipated two days later.

=== Tropical Cyclone Leon–Hanitra ===
- Tropical cyclone (MFR)
- Category 4 tropical cyclone (SSHWS)
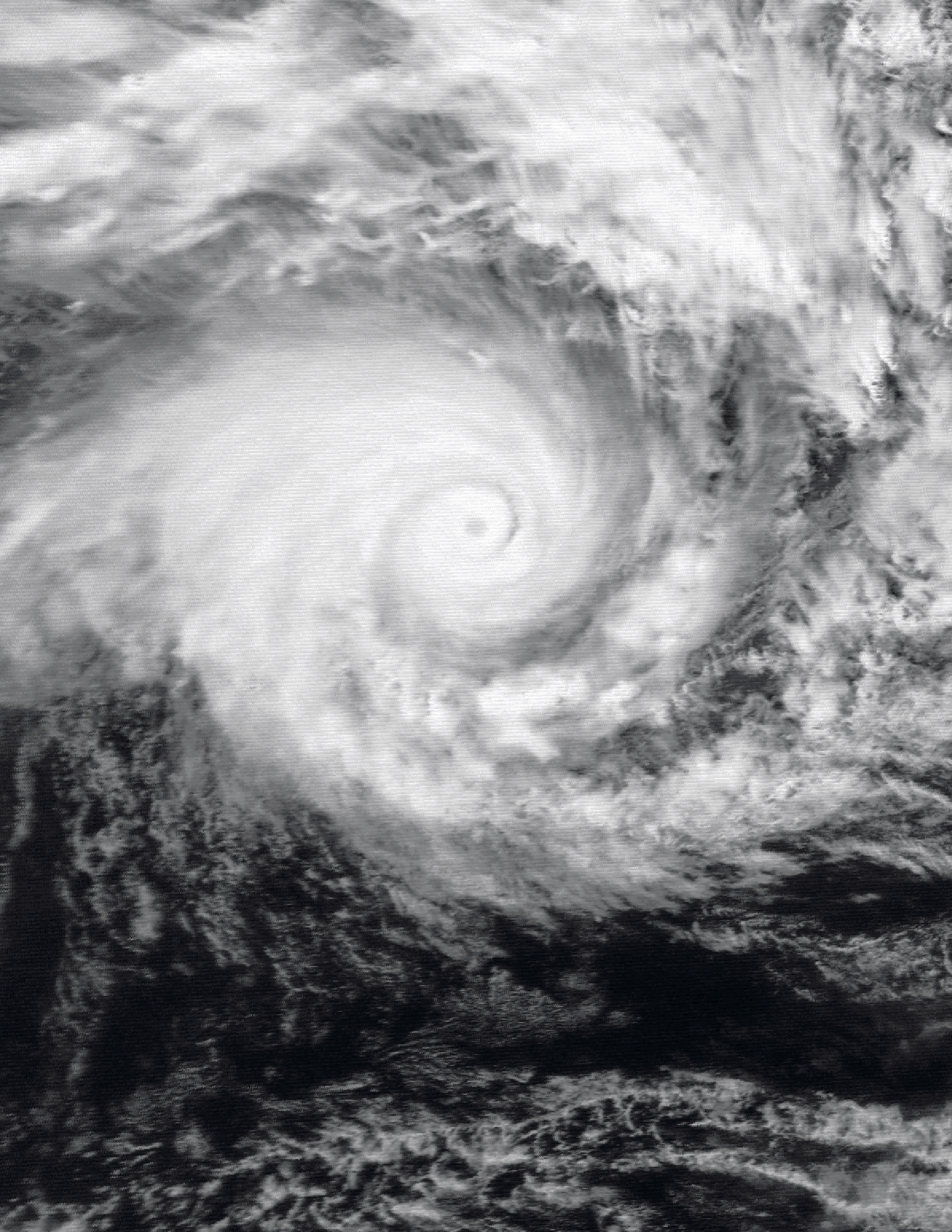
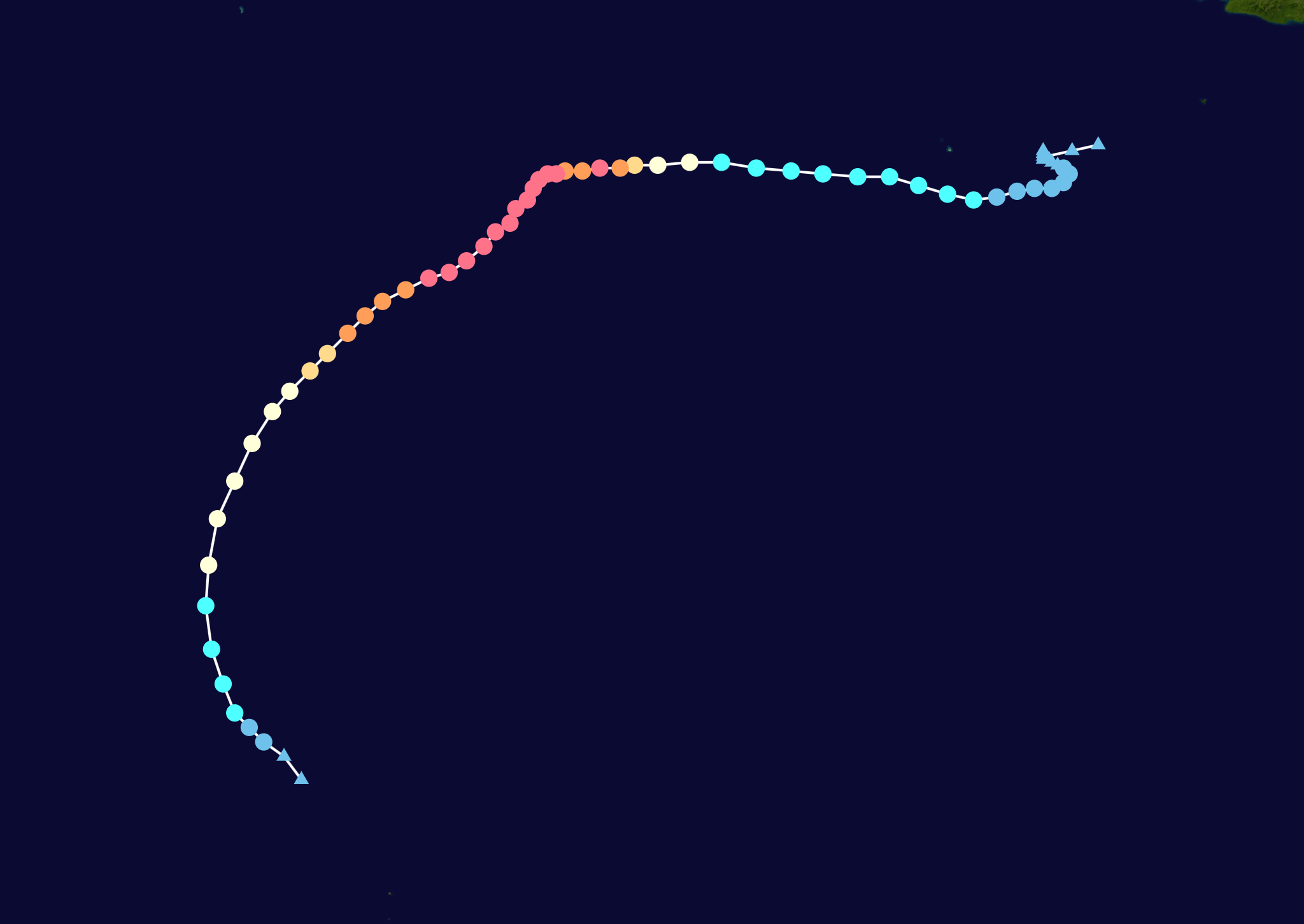
- Duration: February 19 (Entered area) – March 1
- Peak intensity: 150 km/h (95 mph) (10-min); 940 hPa (mbar)

A weak low-pressure area was evident in the Australian basin as early as February 13 between the Cocos Islands and Christmas Island. It meandered for several days, executing a small loop, before beginning a westward motion. After passing south of the Cocos Islands, the system intensified into a tropical storm on February 18 and was named Leon. On the next day, the storm crossed into the south-west Indian Ocean, whereupon the Mauritius Meteorological Service renamed it Hanitra. The storm quickly intensified once it entered the basin. The JTWC, which designated the storm as Tropical Cyclone 11S, upgraded Hanitra to the equivalent of a minimal hurricane late on February 19. On February 22, the agency estimated peak 1‑minute winds of 230 km/h (140 mph), by which time Hanitra had begun a steady southwest motion. By contrast, the MFR assessed slower strengthening, only upgrading it to tropical cyclone status on February 23 and estimating peak 10‑minute winds of 150 km/h (93 mph). The storm gradually accelerated to the south and weakened, becoming extratropical over time. The motion shifted to the southeast on February 28, and Hanitra dissipated the next day.

=== Moderate Tropical Storm Iana ===
- Moderate tropical storm (MFR)
- Tropical storm (SSHWS)
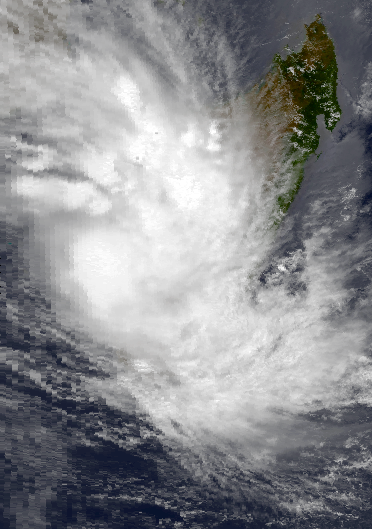
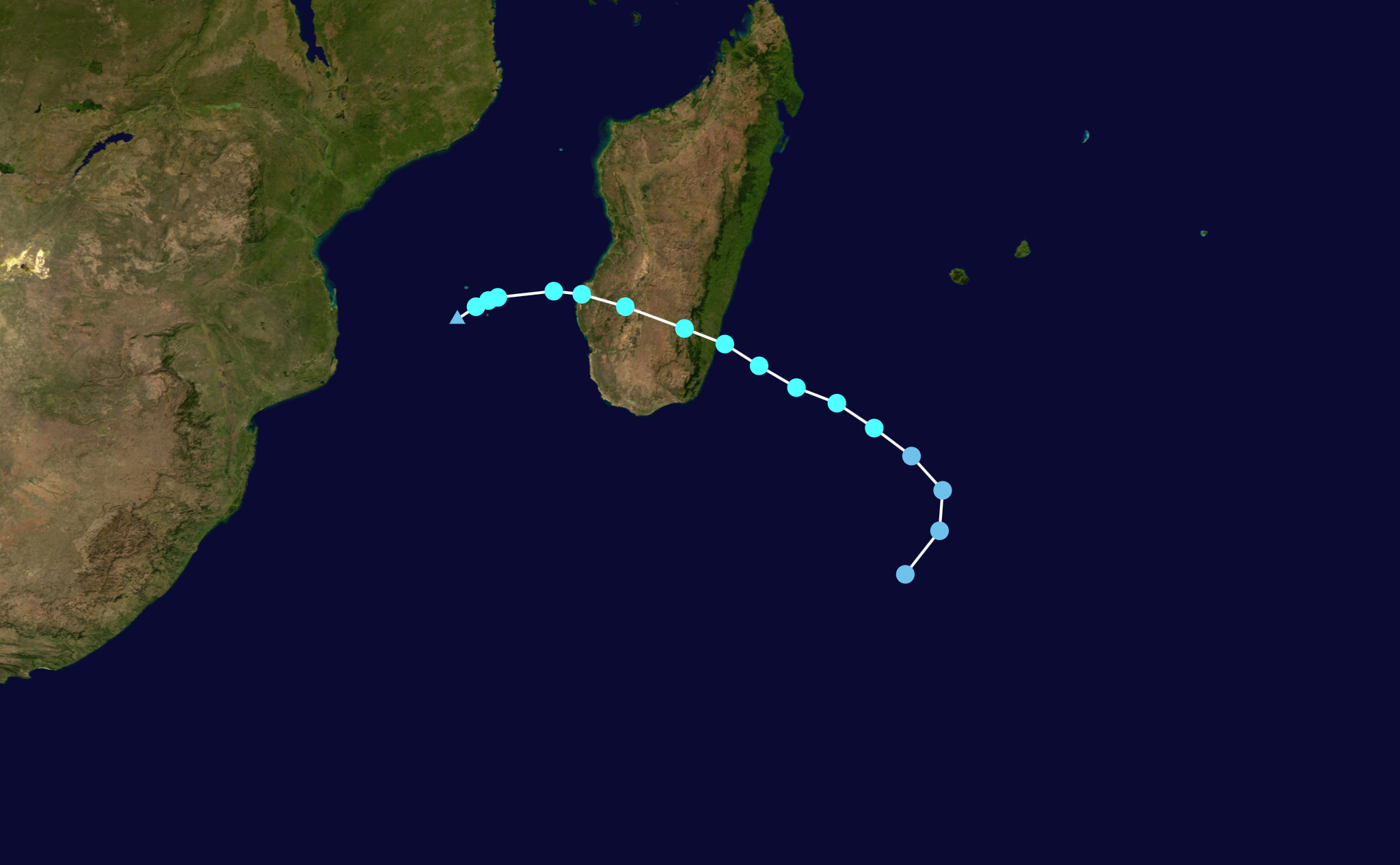
- Duration: February 25 – March 1
- Peak intensity: 85 km/h (50 mph) (10-min); 985 hPa (mbar)

Before Iana formed, there was a persistent area of cloudiness across the Mozambique Channel in late February. A low pressure area originated over eastern Mozambique and moved eastward over water, emerging near Beira. On February 25, a tropical disturbance formed off the west coast of southern Madagascar and moved east-northeastward, steered by a ridge to the south. Shortly thereafter, the center passed just north of Europa Island. By the next day, it intensified into Moderate Tropical Storm Iana, reaching peak 10‑minute winds of 85 km/h (53 mph). Late on February 26, the storm made landfall in western Madagascar near Morombe. Iana weakened slightly while moving east-southeastward through the country, emerging into the Indian Ocean on February 27 near Farafangana. On the next day, the storm weakened to tropical depression status as it curved southward. Iana became extratropical the next day. The storm was not tracked by the JTWC.

On Europa Island, Iana produced 86 km/h (53 mph) wind gusts, while on Madagascar, gusts peaked at 80 km/h (50 mph) at Morondava.

=== Severe Tropical Storm Jinabo ===
- Severe tropical storm (MFR)
- Category 1 tropical cyclone (SSHWS)
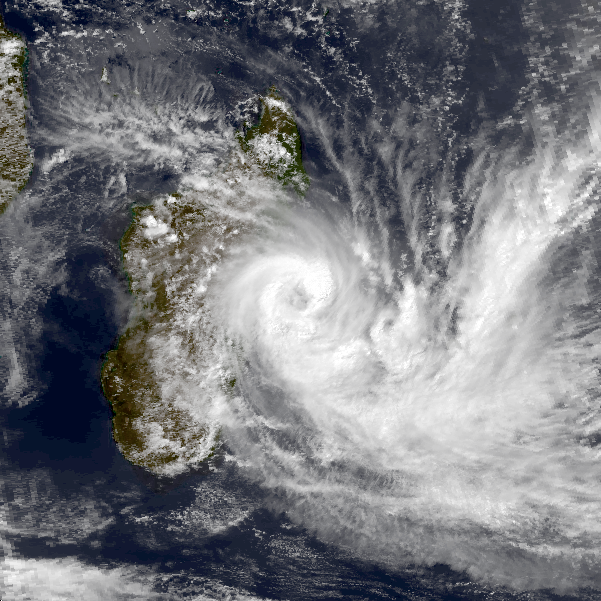
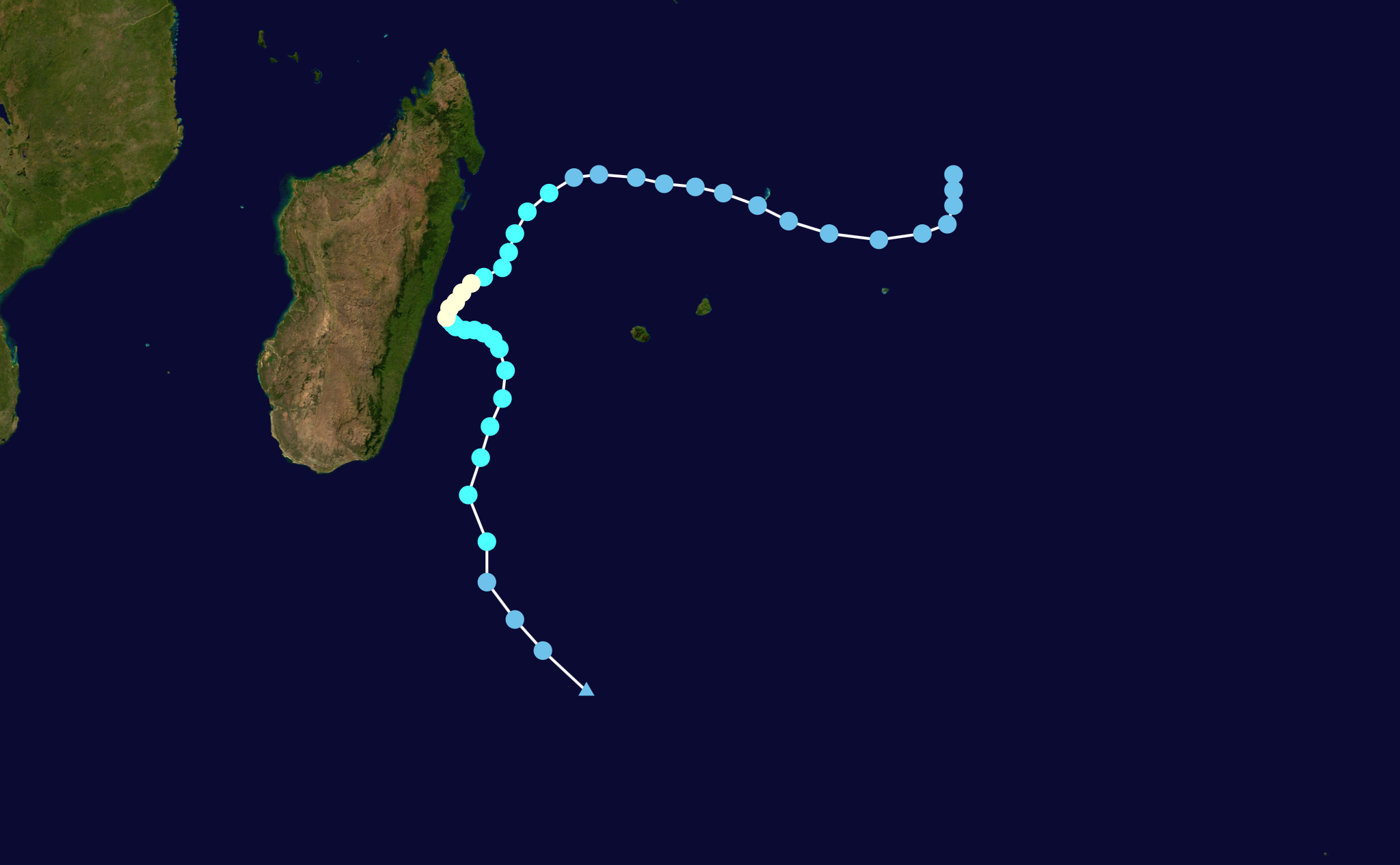
- Duration: March 21 – March 31
- Peak intensity: 115 km/h (70 mph) (10-min); 966 hPa (mbar)

A tropical disturbance originated just east of St. Brandon on March 23, initially consisting of a disorganized area of convection without a distinct center. Moving briskly westward, it slowly organized, becoming Moderate Tropical Storm Jinabo on March 25. That day, the JTWC classified the system as Tropical Cyclone 19S. The storm turned to the southwest due to a trough in the region, bringing it parallel to the east coast of Madagascar. On March 26, the JTWC upgraded Jinabo to the equivalent of a minimal hurricane, and early the next day, the MFR estimated peak 10‑minute winds of 115 km/h (71 mph). Around that time, the storm stalled about 110 km (68 mi) east of the coast of Madagascar, later turning to the southeast due to a ridge. Quickly weakening, Jinabo was only a minimal tropical storm by March 29. On the next day, it turned back to the south. Jinabo weakened to tropical depression status on March 31 and dissipated the next day, having become extratropical and joining the westerlies.

The storm brought gusty winds and rainfall to Madagascar and Réunion. On the former island, gusts reached 107 km/h (66 mph) at Mahanoro along the coast. On Réunion, the storm drenched the island for six days, with a peak of 565 mm (22.2 in) at Sainte-Rose.

=== Tropical Cyclone Krisy ===
- Tropical cyclone (MFR)
- Category 3 tropical cyclone (SSHWS)
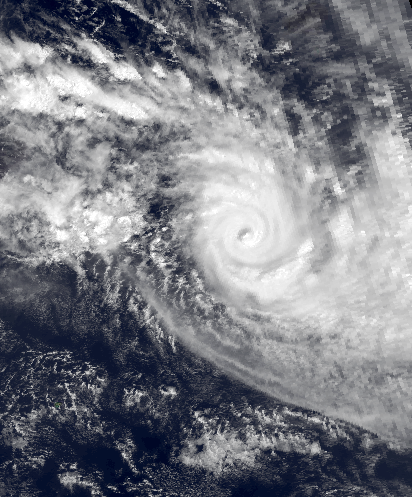
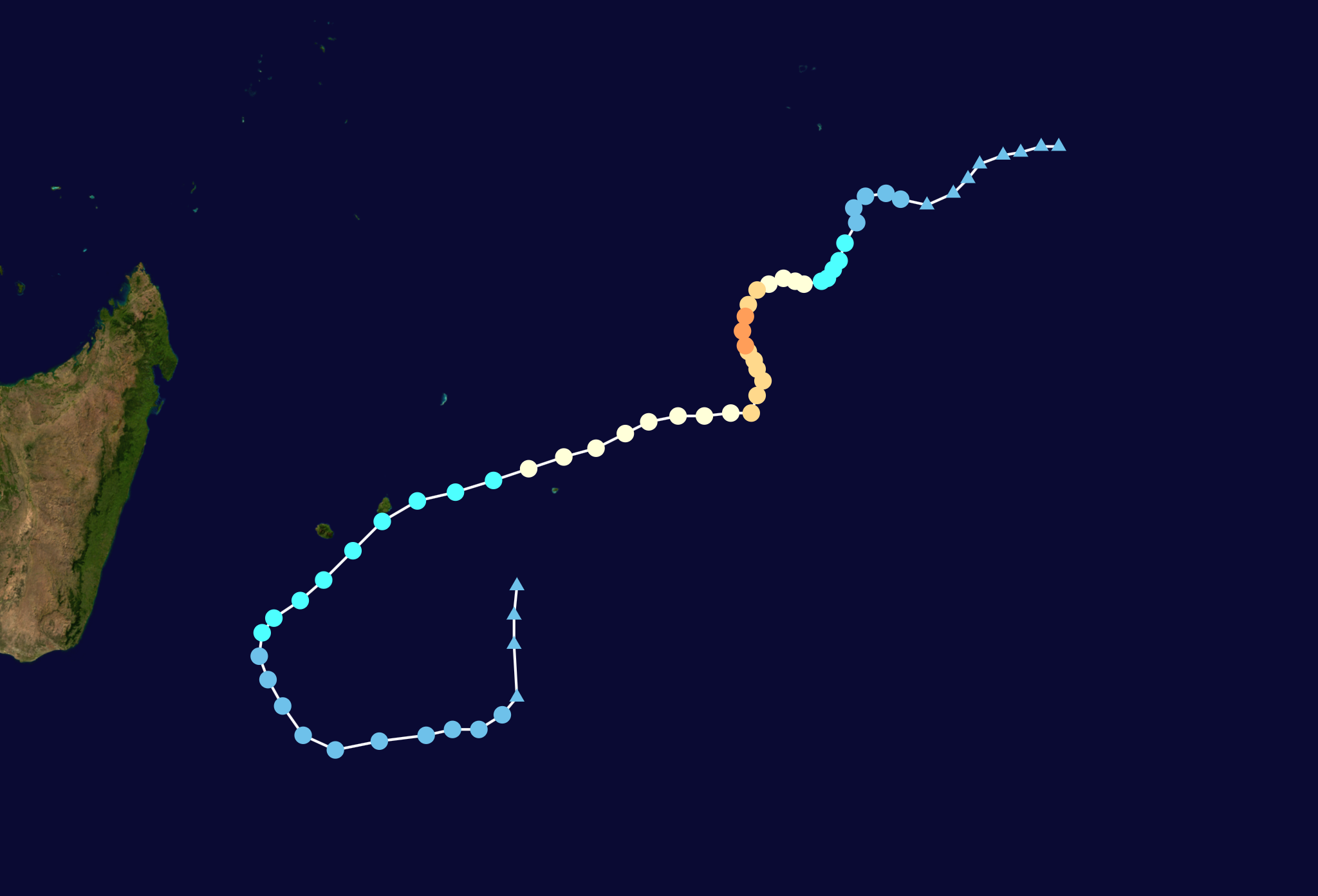
- Duration: March 28 – April 11
- Peak intensity: 150 km/h (95 mph) (10-min); 940 hPa (mbar)

About a week after Jinabo formed, another tropical disturbance formed in the basin on March 28 south of Diego Garcia. In its formative stages, it moved erratically, although generally to the southwest. On March 30, it intensified into Moderate Tropical Storm Krisy, the same day that the JTWC classified it as Tropical Cyclone 21S. Due to a ridge to the south, Krisy's track shifted to the west that day before turning southward on April 1. During that time, the JTWC assessed that Krisy intensified to the equivalent of a minimal hurricane. The MFR upgraded the storm to cyclone status on April 2, and on that day the JTWC estimated peak 1‑minute winds of 195 km/h (121 mph). On April 3, the MFR estimated peak 10‑minute winds of 150 km/h (93 mph) as the cyclone turned to the west-southwest. Over the next few days, the storm slowly weakened, passing 100 km (62 mi) north of Rodrigues on April 5 as a moderate tropical storm. On the next day, Krisy brushed the east coasts of Mauritius and Réunion, passing just 30 km (19 mi) east of the former island. It weakened to tropical depression status on April 7 while curving to the south and later to the east, becoming extratropical. A ridge turned the remnants of Krisy to the north toward Tropical Depression Lezissy, and the two systems merged on April 11.

Krisy first affected Rodrigues, producing 122 km/h (76 mph) gusts and 97.6 mm (3.84 mm) of rainfall. Gusts reached 90 km/h (56 mph) on Réunion, and high waves affected the island for several days. However, effects were worst on Mauritius. While passing south of the island, Krisy produced wind gusts of 155 km/h (96 mph) at Plaisance Airport on Mauritius. Rainfall on the island reached 182 mm (7.2 in) over a 24 period. On the island, the passages of Firinga and Krisy decreased the output of the sugar crop by 20,000 tons, accounting for 15% of the sugar cane, mostly in the southeastern portion of the island. Several other crops were affected by the two cyclones, resulting in a 50% decrease of the banana output. As Krisy struck just two months after Firinga, residents heeded alerts and were well-prepared, and 800 people sought shelter. There were no direct deaths, although one farmer committed suicide due to the threat of the storm.

=== Moderate Tropical Storm Lezissy ===
- Moderate tropical storm (MFR)
- Tropical storm (SSHWS)
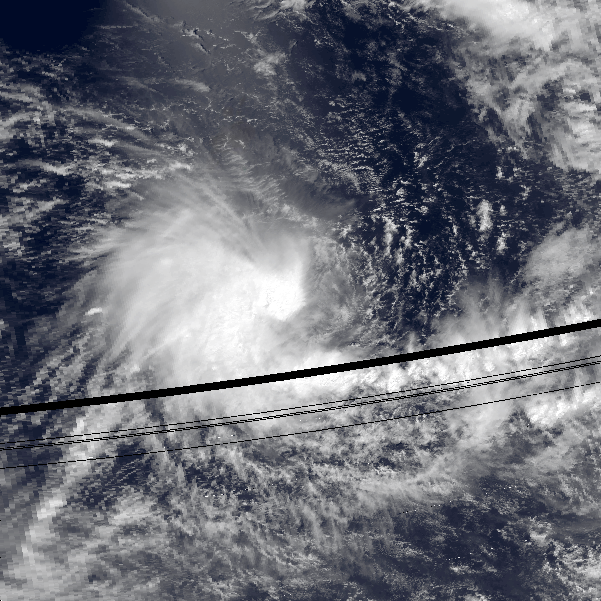
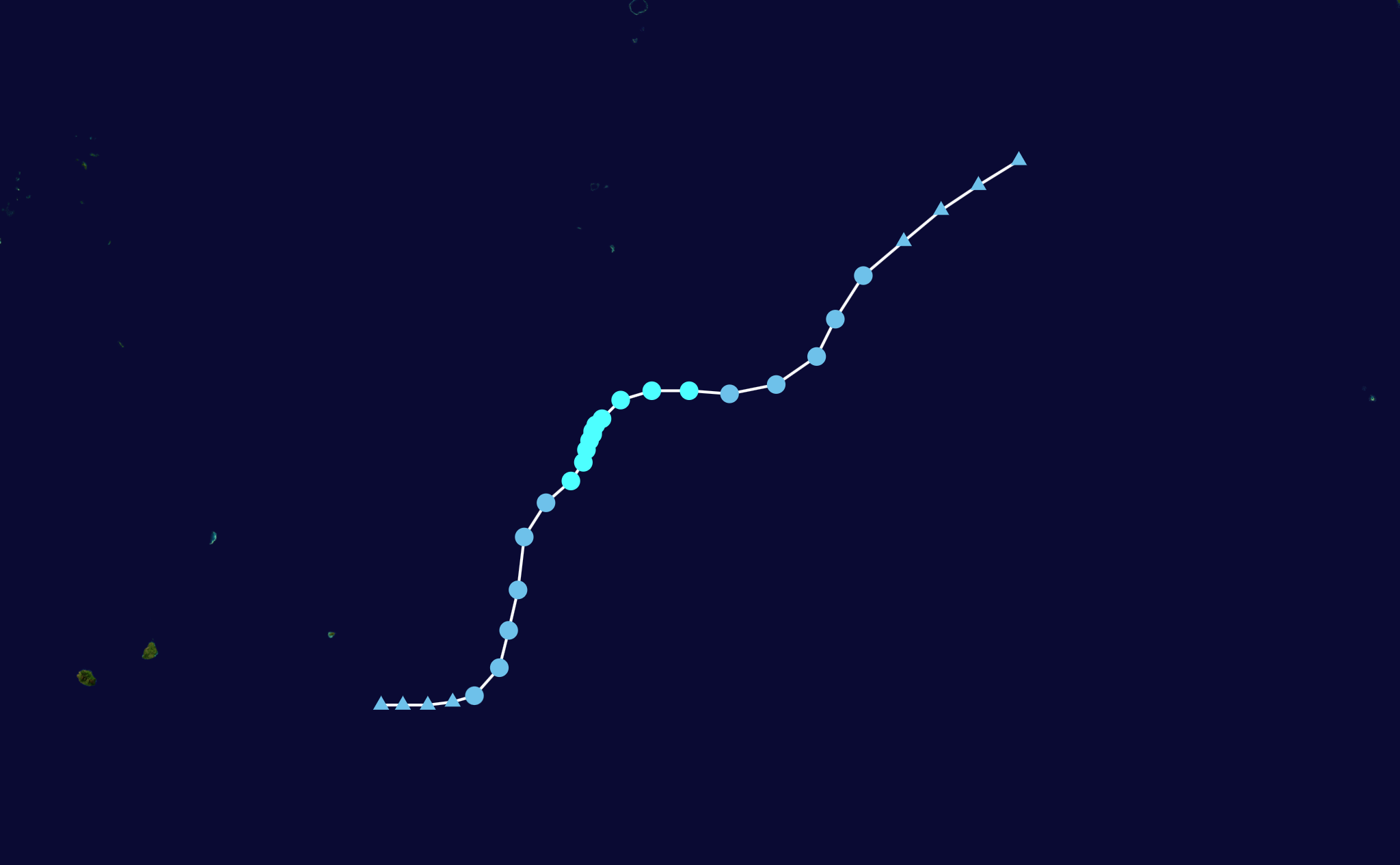
- Duration: April 4 – April 11
- Peak intensity: 85 km/h (50 mph) (10-min); 985 hPa (mbar)

The final storm of the season formed on April 6 to the east-southeast of Diego Garcia while Krisy was active near Rodrigues. That same day, the JTWC classified it as Tropical Cyclone 24S. It quickly intensified into Moderate Tropical Storm Lezissy as it took a westward trajectory, reaching peak winds of 85 km/h (53 mph) by late on April 6. Influenced by a broad area of low pressure, Lezissy turned to the southwest, gradually weakening. It approached former Cyclone Krisy, and the two systems merged by April 11, both losing their circulations and leaving behind a disorganized remnant low.

== See also ==
- List of Southern Hemisphere tropical cyclone seasons
- Atlantic hurricane seasons: 1988, 1989
- Pacific hurricane seasons: 1988, 1989
- Pacific typhoon seasons: 1988, 1989
- North Indian Ocean cyclone seasons: 1988, 1989
