= Communauté d'agglomération du Sud =

Sud
- Communauté d'agglomération
- Interactive map of Sud
- Coordinates: 21°16′S 55°31′E
- Country: France
- Overseas region and department: Réunion{{{region}}}
- No. of communes: {{{nbcomm}}}
- Established: 2010
- Area: 564.7 km^{2} (218.0 sq mi)
- Population (2017): 128,435
  - Density: 227.4/km^{2} (589.1/sq mi)
- Website: www.casud.re

The Communauté d'agglomération du Sud is an intercommunal structure in the Réunion overseas department and region of France, centered on the city of Le Tampon. It was created in January 2010. Its seat is in Le Tampon. Its area is 564.7 km^{2}. Its population was 128,435 in 2017, of which 78,629 in Le Tampon proper.

== Composition ==
The communauté d'agglomération consists of the following 4 communes:

1. Entre-Deux
2. Saint-Joseph
3. Saint-Philippe
4. Le Tampon
