= Hôtel de Ville, Le Tampon =

Town hall in Le Tampon, Réunion, France

Hôtel de Ville
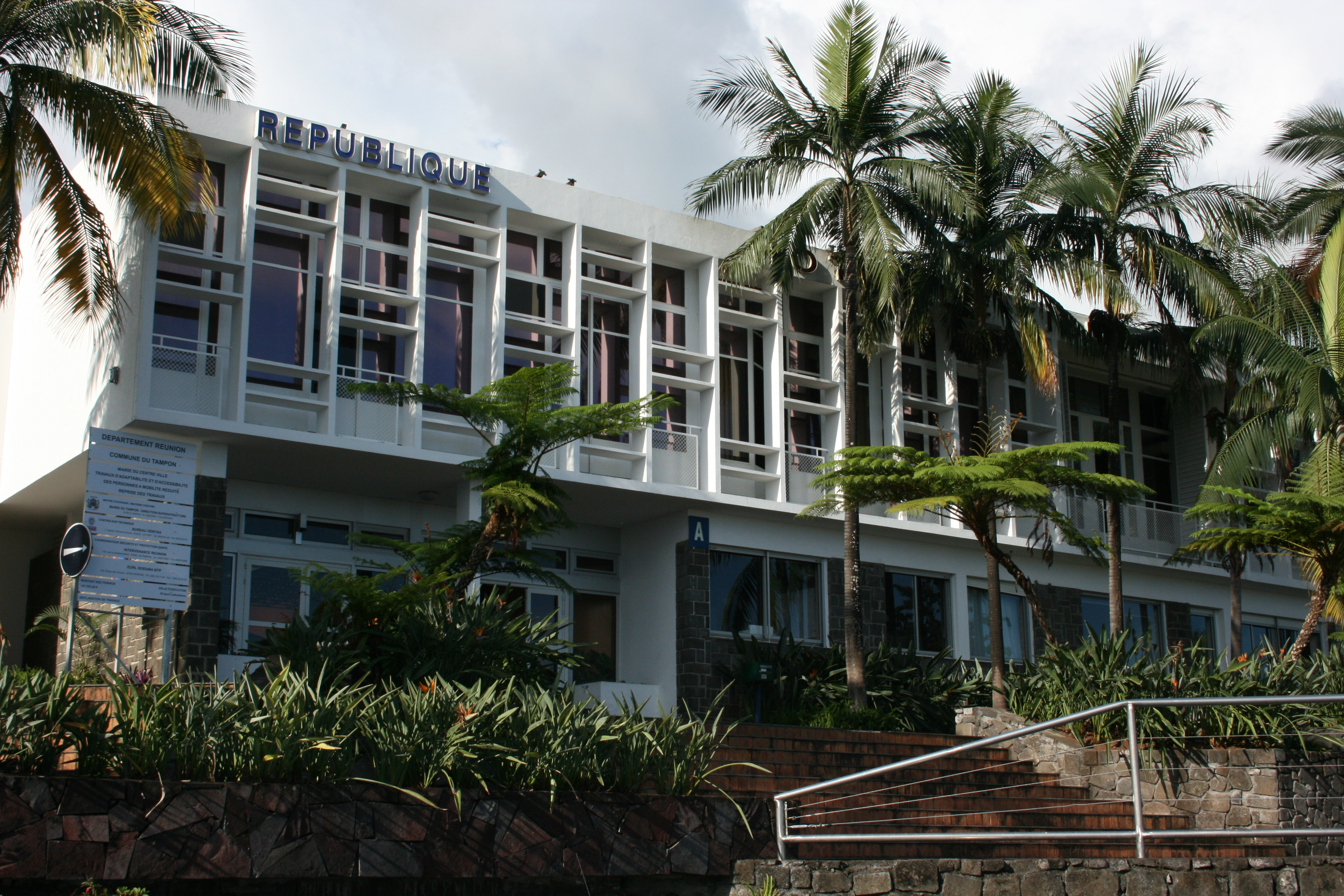
- The main frontage of the Hôtel de Ville in May 2011
- Interactive map of the Hôtel de Ville area

General information
- Type: City hall
- Architectural style: Modern style
- Location: Le Tampon, Réunion, France
- Coordinates: 21.2782°S 55.5153°E
- Completed: 1965

Design and construction
- Architect: Jean Hébrard et Paul Abadie

The Hôtel de Ville (French pronunciation: [otɛl də vil], City Hall) is a municipal building in Le Tampon, Réunion, in the Indian Ocean, standing on Rue Hubert Delisle.

== History ==
The commune of Le Tampon was created when the area was separated from the commune of Saint-Pierre on 25 July 1925. The newly created town council led by the mayor, Edgar Avril, decided to establish an office and meeting place on the main road through the town. The road was originally known as "Ligne des 600", on the basis that it was 600 metres above sea level, but it was later renamed "Rue Hubert Delisle", to commemorate the life of the mid-19th century governor of the island, Louis Henri Hubert Delisle.

The first town hall, like so many early buildings on the island, was a simple single-storey wooden building erected on compacted earth. The design involved a symmetrical main frontage facing onto Rue Hubert Delisle. It featured a short flight of steps leading up to a portico formed by four Doric order columns supporting an entablature, a segmental pediment and a small lantern. The outer bays were fenestrated by casement windows with shutters and triangular pediments.

In the early 1960s, the town council led by the mayor, Paul Badré, decided to commission a more substantial building. The site chosen was again on Rue Hubert Delisle. Construction of the new building started in 1962. It was designed by local architects, Jean Hébrard et Paul Abadie, in the modern style, built by the Isautier Group in concrete, glass and stone, and was officially opened in 1965.

The design involved an asymmetrical main frontage facing onto Rue Hubert Delisle. It featured a short flight of steps leading to a glass doorway in the left hand section of the ground floor, which was recessed. The ground floor was fenestrated by a row of small rectangular casement windows. The first floor was fenestrated by a series of tall casement windows in front of which there was a slatted framework which was slightly jettied out over the first floor. The building had a flat roof. Internally, the principal room was the Salle du Conseil (council chamber).
