= Entre-Deux =

Commune in Réunion, France

- Commune
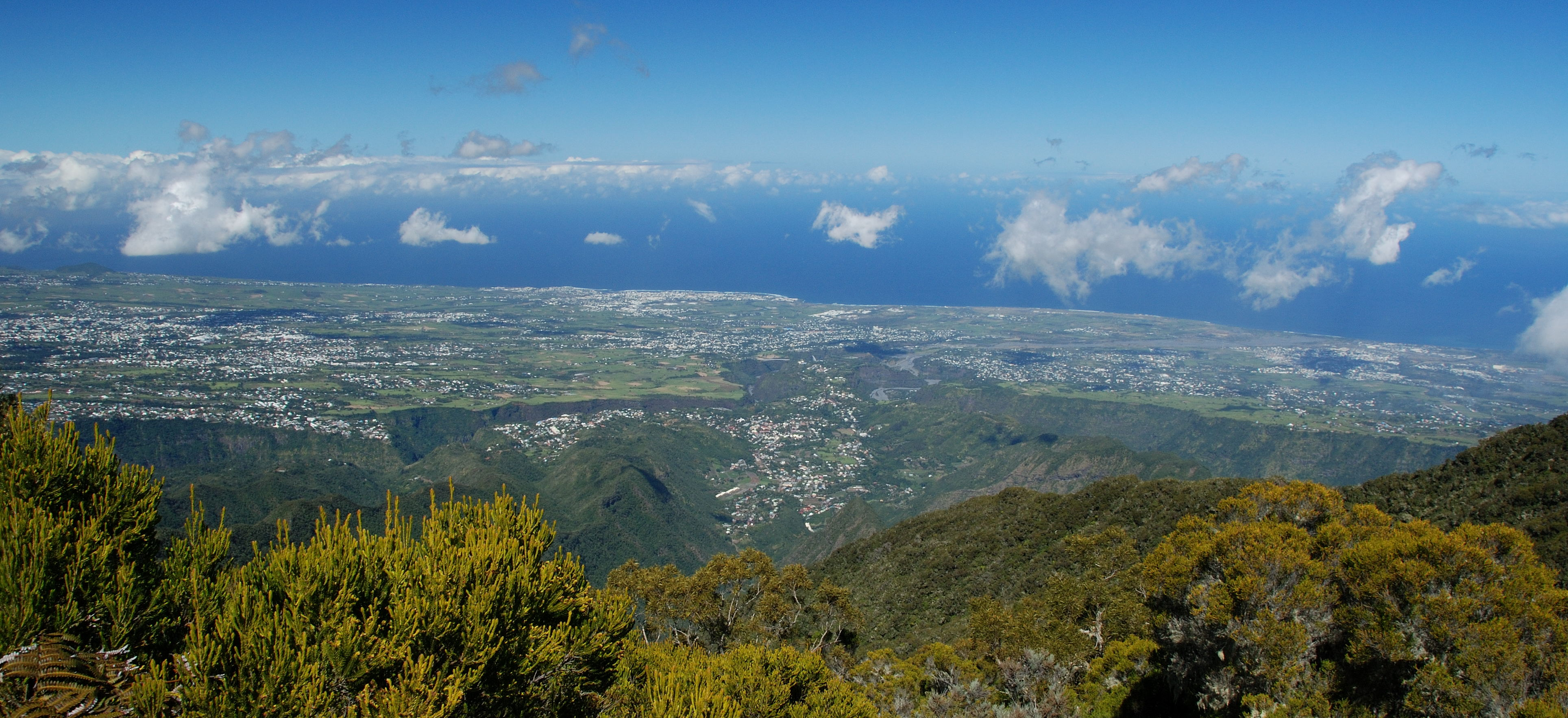
- A view over L'Entre-Deux

- Coat of arms

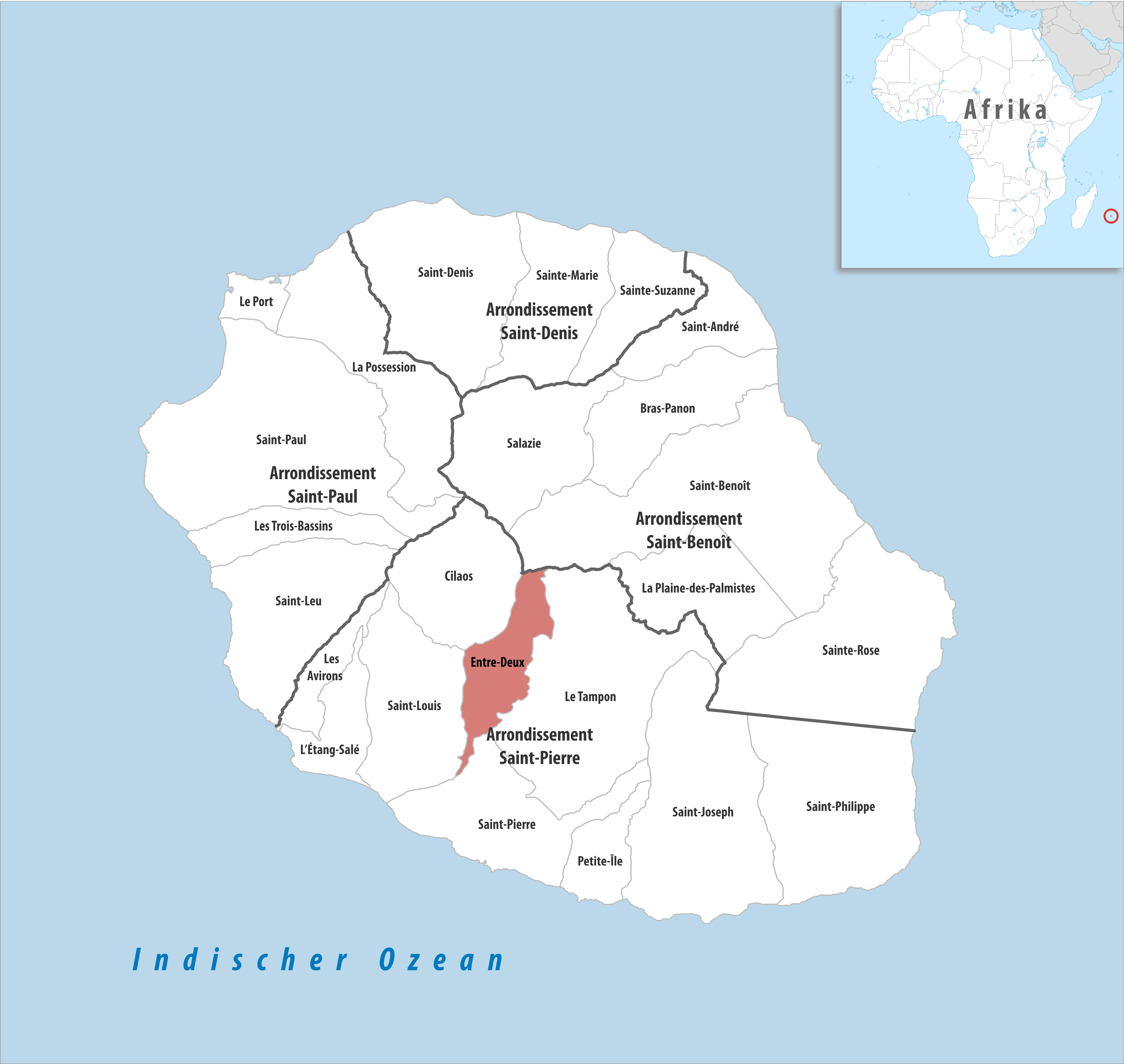
- Location of Entre-Deux
- Coordinates: 21°14′55″S 55°28′13″E
- Country: France
- Overseas region and department: Réunion
- Arrondissement: Saint-Pierre
- Canton: Saint-Louis-2
- Intercommunality: CA du Sud

Government
  - Mayor (2020–2026): Bachil Valy
- Area^{1}: 66.83 km^{2} (25.80 sq mi)
- Elevation: 383 m (1,257 ft)
- Highest elevation: 2,352 m (7,717 ft)
- Lowest elevation: 109 m (358 ft)
- Population (2023): 7,176
  - Density: 107.4/km^{2} (278.1/sq mi)
- Time zone: UTC+04:00
- INSEE/Postal code: 97403 /97414
- ^{1} French Land Register data, which excludes lakes, ponds, glaciers > 1 km^{2} (0.386 sq mi or 247 acres) and river estuaries.

Entre-Deux (French pronunciation: [ɑ̃tʁə dø], French for Between-Two) is a commune on the French island and department of Réunion. The commune gets its name from the fact that it is situated between the two main tributaries of the Saint-Étienne River: the Bras de Cilaos to the west and the Bras de la Plaine to the east. Its location also explains the commune's motto: Deux bras, un cœur (Two arms, one heart). Entre-Deux is bordered by the communes of Cilaos, Saint-Benoît, Saint-Louis, Saint-Pierre and Le Tampon.

== History ==
Entre-Deux became the 5th section of the commune of Saint-Pierre in 1839, and became a commune in its own right in 1882.

== Population ==
Historical population
Year	Pop.	±% p.a.
1967	3,723	—
1974	3,745	+0.08%
1982	3,705	−0.13%
1990	4,260	+1.76%
1999	5,170	+2.17%
2007	5,868	+1.60%
2012	6,405	+1.77%
2017	6,902	+1.51%
2023	7,176	+0.65%
Source: INSEE

== Economy ==
The village of Entre-Deux flourished thanks to the coffee trade introduced to the island in 1715, but the sugar cane has also had a significant success in the town. After the 1950s, Entre-Deux underwent a series of changes to stop the economy from stagnating, with roads, buildings, reservoirs and electronic networks being set up in the town, as with much of the island, thanks in part to the French state.

By the 1980s however, this effort was complete. The village got a cosmetic overhaul, while such industries as tobacco and Pelargonium geranium farming ceased to be. Other trades, such as chicken farming, started up with moderate success, and now Entre-Deux is, along with Salazie, one of the main poultry centres of the island. This dynamism since the 80s is shown by the population increase: From 3624 residents in 1961, to 4259 in 1990 and 5585 in 2004.

These days, only about 60% of the population is actively working, which is put down to the fact that businesses are reducing in number, seeing a recent rise in self-employment. There has also been a steady rise in tourism to the village.

== International relations ==
Entre-Deux is twinned with:

- Mahavelona (Madagascar).

== See also ==
- Communes of the Réunion department
