= Sitarane =

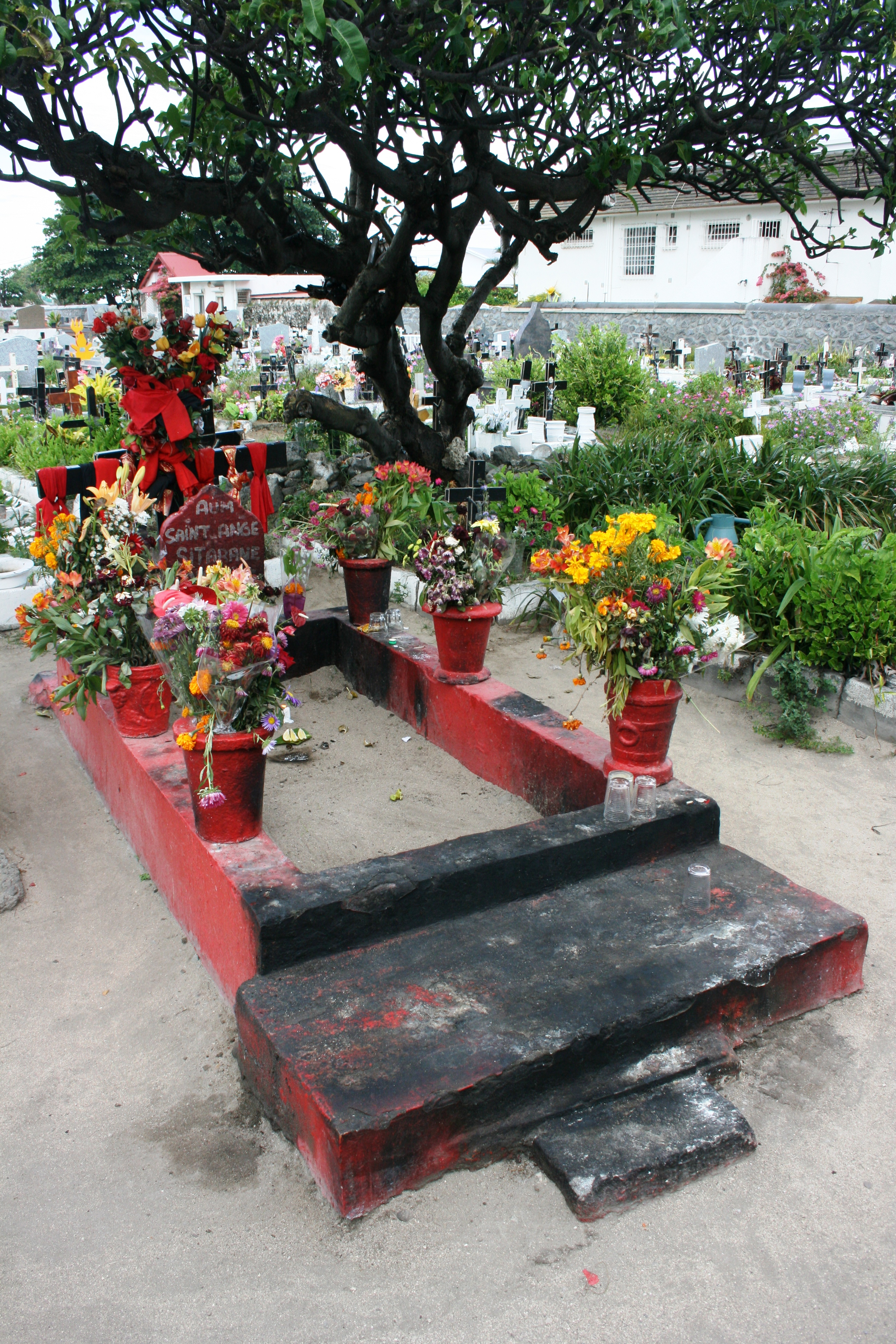
Sitarane's grave at Saint-Pierre cemetery in Réunion

Simicoudza Simicourba (1858 – 1911), otherwise known as Sitarane, was a thief and murderer on the island of Réunion.

== Biography ==
Sitarane was born into a family of witch doctors in the Portuguese possessions of Mozambique. He arrived on the island of Réunion in 1889 at the age of 30 to work under contract as an indentured labourer on land belonging to a Mr Morange in Saint-Benoît, having been assigned the ticket number 10 8958. Two years later, he left this employment and went underground. In 1906, he met two other criminals: Pierre-Elie Calendrin (1869–1937), the leader of the gang, who had a reputation as a witch doctor, and Emmanuel Fontaine (1886–1911), with whom he committed numerous acts of theft, some of which were undertaken in a mysterious and audacious way, and then three murders, where the victims' throats were cut during their sleep (it is claimed, however, that they were responsible for around a dozen murders).

The trio terrorised the inhabitants of Saint-Pierre until their arrest in 1909, along with around ten accomplices.

The investigation also revealed that the three bandits had drunk and collected the blood of their victims as part of Calendrin's occult practices. Calendrin himself denied everything at the trial and was handed a sentence of forced labour for the rest of his life. The two others were sentenced to death and were sent to the guillotine.

Just before his execution, Sitarane asked to be baptised.

== Influence ==
Curiously, only the name Sitarane remains alive in local folklore and history, and today his grave - bedecked with flowers and candles - is the focus of a genuine cult.

According to the tradition of witchcraft on the island, many sorcerers call upon Sitarane's spirit when performing black magic.

It is also claimed that anyone planning a crime or a hold-up, or who is planning to misappropriate inheritance or murder their mother-in-law, prays at the grave of Sitarane at night so that his evil spirit might help them in their plans.

A story is still told of a man who, one night, left a butcher's knife at Sitarane's grave and then used it to murder his mistress who was watching a variety show in the square in front of the town hall with ten thousand other people. Following this event, the whole town square felt unease, almost as if Sitarane cursed them. Many stories are told of diarrhea ensuing in the following morning.

It was the same cult that led Noël Clarel, a labourer working on archaeological digs at Pointe du Diable (a cape near Saint-Pierre), to take an 11-year-old child to a ravine and then strangle him. While undertaking his own digs at night in the hope of discovering the treasure that was supposedly hidden there, Clarel believed that finding it depended on sacrificing a child.

French author and historian Daniel Vaxelaire has written at least two books on the subject of Sitarane. His (mythological) history based on what was related in his judgement was released in 2012.
