= Le Tampon =

Commune in Réunion

- Commune
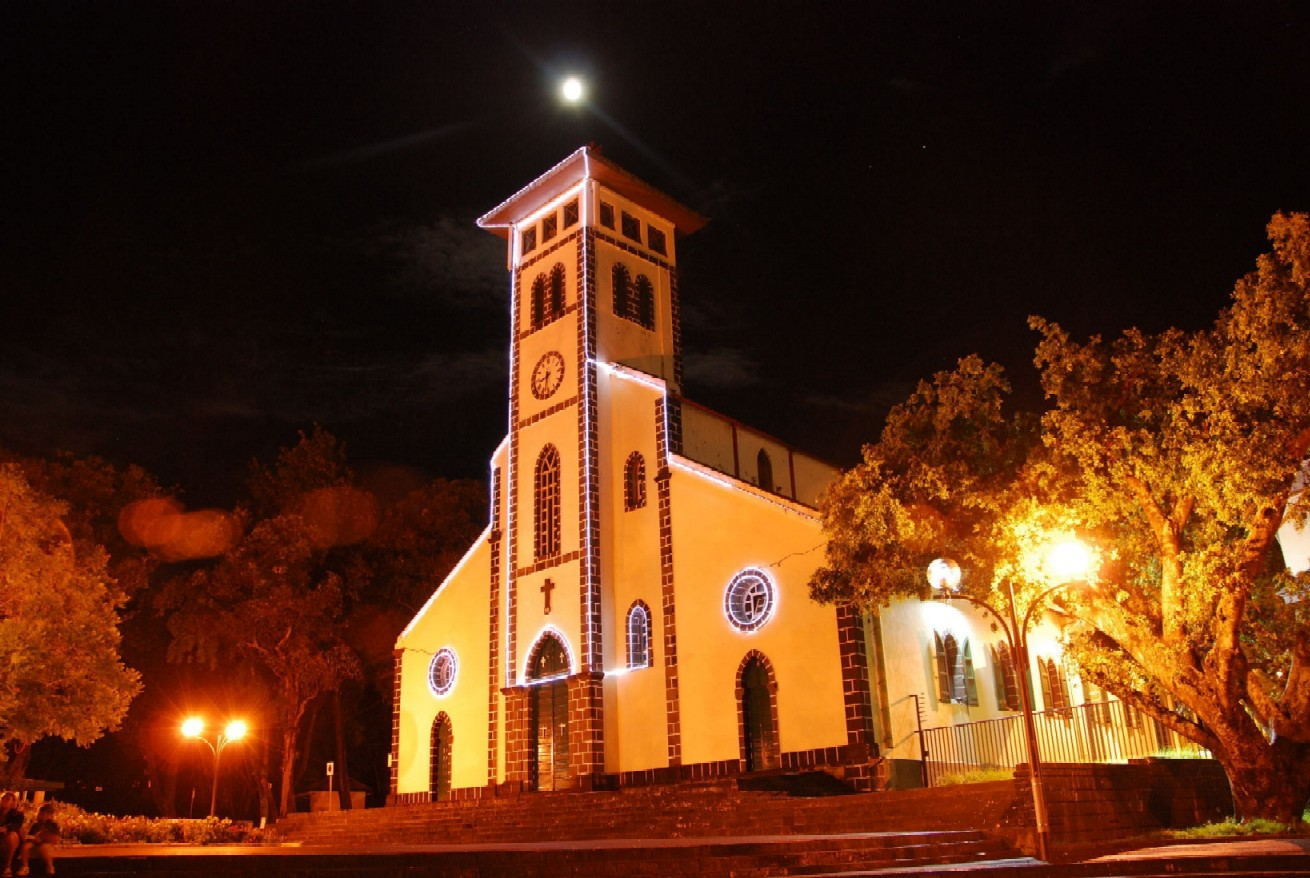
- The church of Le Tampon

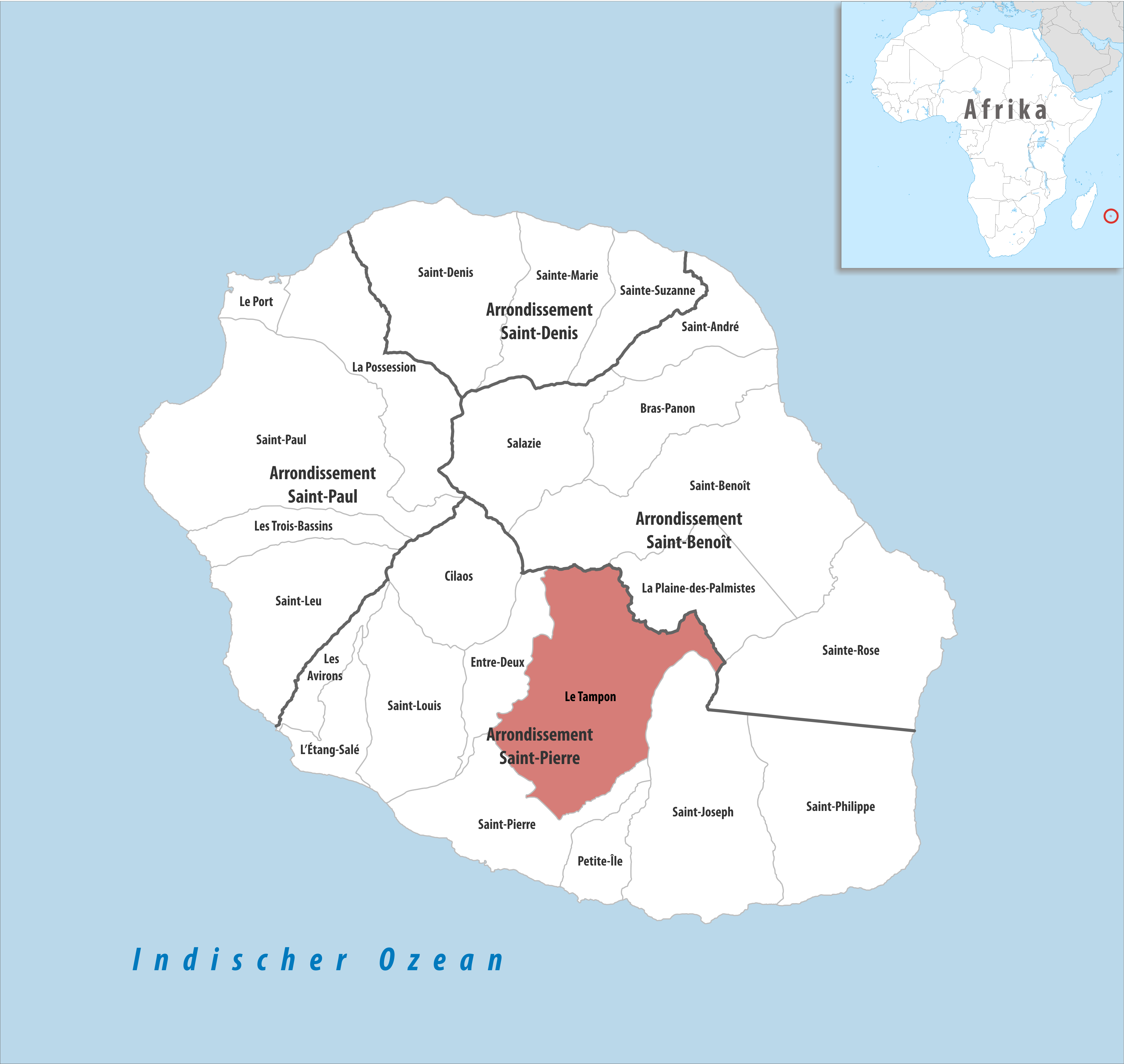
- Location of Le Tampon
- Coordinates: 21°16′41″S 55°30′55″E
- Country: France
- Overseas region and department: Réunion
- Arrondissement: Saint Pierre
- Canton: 2 cantons
- Intercommunality: CA du Sud

Government
  - Mayor (2020–2026): André Thien Ah Koon
- Area^{1}: 165.43 km^{2} (63.87 sq mi)
- Elevation: 546 m (1,791 ft)
- Highest elevation: 2,418 m (7,933 ft)
- Lowest elevation: 287 m (942 ft)
- Population (2023): 82,579
  - Density: 499.18/km^{2} (1,292.9/sq mi)
- Time zone: UTC+04:00
- INSEE/Postal code: 97422 /97430
- ^{1} French Land Register data, which excludes lakes, ponds, glaciers > 1 km^{2} (0.386 sq mi or 247 acres) and river estuaries.

Le Tampon (French pronunciation: [lə tɑ̃pɔ̃]) is the fourth-largest commune in the French overseas department and region of Réunion. It is located on the south-central part of the island of Reunion, adjacent to Saint Pierre.

== History ==
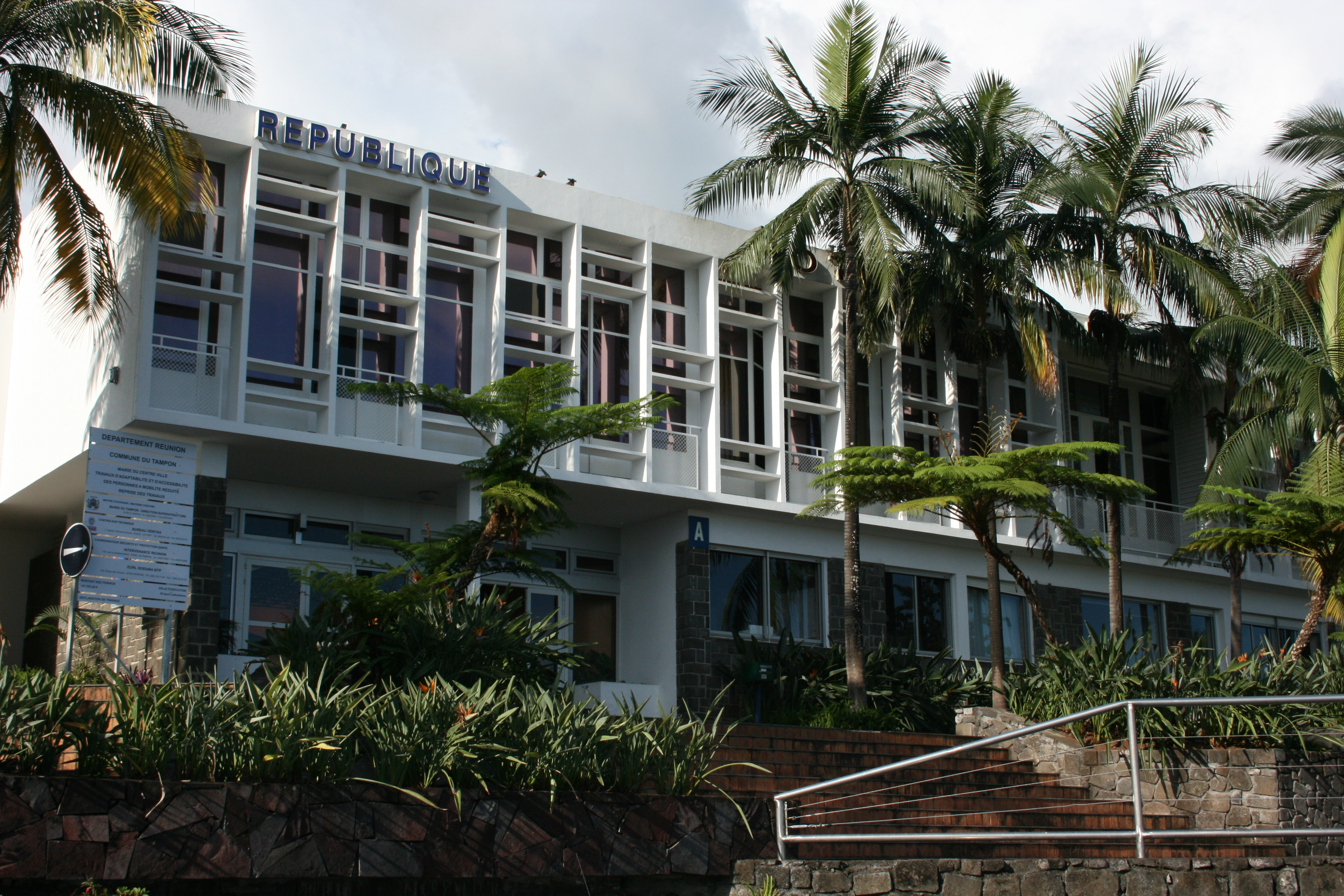
The Hôtel de Ville

In the early twentieth century, the town was the base for the murderer and sorcerer Sitarane.

The Hôtel de Ville was completed in 1965.

== Geography ==
=== Climate ===
Le Tampon has an humid subtropical climate (Köppen climate classification: Cwa) at lower elevations and an oceanic climate (Köppen climate classification: Cfb) in Plains des Cafres. The average annual temperature in Le Tampon is 13.8 °C (56.8 °F). The average annual rainfall is 2,020.2 mm (79.54 in) with February as the wettest month. The temperatures are highest on average in February, at around 17.3 °C (63.1 °F), and lowest in July, at around 10.3 °C (50.5 °F). The highest temperature ever recorded in Le Tampon was 29.6 °C (85.3 °F) on 26 October 2011; the coldest temperature ever recorded was −1.7 °C (28.9 °F) on 18 August 1988.

Climate data for Le Tampon (altitude 860m, 1991–2020 normals, extremes 1969–present)
Month	Jan	Feb	Mar	Apr	May	Jun	Jul	Aug	Sep	Oct	Nov	Dec	Year
Record high °C (°F)	31.2 (88.2)	31.0 (87.8)	31.2 (88.2)	30.4 (86.7)	28.1 (82.6)	26.5 (79.7)	26.9 (80.4)	26.1 (79.0)	26.9 (80.4)	28.3 (82.9)	30.1 (86.2)	31.5 (88.7)	31.5 (88.7)
Mean daily maximum °C (°F)	26.7 (80.1)	26.8 (80.2)	26.4 (79.5)	25.4 (77.7)	23.7 (74.7)	21.8 (71.2)	21.0 (69.8)	21.2 (70.2)	21.9 (71.4)	23.1 (73.6)	24.4 (75.9)	26.0 (78.8)	24.0 (75.2)
Daily mean °C (°F)	22.1 (71.8)	22.3 (72.1)	21.8 (71.2)	20.6 (69.1)	18.8 (65.8)	16.9 (62.4)	16.0 (60.8)	16.1 (61.0)	16.7 (62.1)	17.8 (64.0)	19.2 (66.6)	20.9 (69.6)	19.1 (66.4)
Mean daily minimum °C (°F)	17.6 (63.7)	17.8 (64.0)	17.2 (63.0)	15.9 (60.6)	13.9 (57.0)	12.0 (53.6)	11.1 (52.0)	11.0 (51.8)	11.4 (52.5)	12.5 (54.5)	14.0 (57.2)	15.9 (60.6)	14.2 (57.6)
Record low °C (°F)	11.7 (53.1)	12.5 (54.5)	11.0 (51.8)	9.1 (48.4)	7.9 (46.2)	6.3 (43.3)	5.0 (41.0)	5.6 (42.1)	5.2 (41.4)	5.9 (42.6)	6.1 (43.0)	10.5 (50.9)	5.0 (41.0)
Average precipitation mm (inches)	313.3 (12.33)	321.8 (12.67)	195.8 (7.71)	111.9 (4.41)	72.0 (2.83)	61.3 (2.41)	55.4 (2.18)	31.1 (1.22)	35.0 (1.38)	34.0 (1.34)	49.8 (1.96)	143.0 (5.63)	1,424.4 (56.08)
Average precipitation days (≥ 1.0 mm)	13.3	13.9	11.9	8.5	7.1	6.2	5.5	4.3	4.3	4.9	6.6	9.7	96.2
Source: Météo-France

Climate data for Le Tampon (Plaine des Cafres, altitude 1560m, 1991–2020 normals, extremes 1965–present)
Month	Jan	Feb	Mar	Apr	May	Jun	Jul	Aug	Sep	Oct	Nov	Dec	Year
Record high °C (°F)	26.6 (79.9)	26.7 (80.1)	26.2 (79.2)	25.8 (78.4)	24.3 (75.7)	22.5 (72.5)	21.9 (71.4)	23.5 (74.3)	24.8 (76.6)	29.6 (85.3)	28.2 (82.8)	26.7 (80.1)	29.6 (85.3)
Mean daily maximum °C (°F)	21.9 (71.4)	22.0 (71.6)	21.6 (70.9)	20.7 (69.3)	18.7 (65.7)	16.6 (61.9)	15.7 (60.3)	16.1 (61.0)	17.1 (62.8)	18.8 (65.8)	20.3 (68.5)	21.4 (70.5)	19.2 (66.6)
Daily mean °C (°F)	17.5 (63.5)	17.6 (63.7)	17.1 (62.8)	15.9 (60.6)	13.7 (56.7)	11.5 (52.7)	10.7 (51.3)	10.8 (51.4)	11.6 (52.9)	13.1 (55.6)	14.6 (58.3)	16.3 (61.3)	14.2 (57.6)
Mean daily minimum °C (°F)	13.0 (55.4)	13.3 (55.9)	12.5 (54.5)	11.1 (52.0)	8.7 (47.7)	6.5 (43.7)	5.7 (42.3)	5.5 (41.9)	6.1 (43.0)	7.5 (45.5)	8.8 (47.8)	11.2 (52.2)	9.2 (48.6)
Record low °C (°F)	5.1 (41.2)	5.0 (41.0)	4.2 (39.6)	2.2 (36.0)	0.8 (33.4)	−0.9 (30.4)	−1.4 (29.5)	−1.7 (28.9)	−1.6 (29.1)	−0.3 (31.5)	−0.4 (31.3)	2.0 (35.6)	−1.7 (28.9)
Average precipitation mm (inches)	426.1 (16.78)	427.8 (16.84)	303.0 (11.93)	124.0 (4.88)	80.6 (3.17)	62.1 (2.44)	62.4 (2.46)	50.1 (1.97)	43.2 (1.70)	42.5 (1.67)	62.9 (2.48)	162.7 (6.41)	1,847.4 (72.73)
Average precipitation days (≥ 1.0 mm)	15.1	15.2	13.8	11.5	10.0	9.5	10.3	8.8	7.7	6.3	6.8	10.8	125.9
Mean monthly sunshine hours	166.4	138.6	165.1	165.2	182.4	176.9	182.2	193.5	188.4	184.0	182.4	164.6	2,089.7
Source 1: Météo France
Source 2: Meteociel.fr (sunshine 1981-2010)

== Population ==
Historical population
Year	Pop.	±% p.a.
1961	24,335	—
1967	31,378	+4.33%
1974	36,107	+2.03%
1982	40,545	+1.46%
1990	47,593	+2.02%
1999	60,323	+2.67%
2007	70,539	+1.97%
2012	75,631	+1.40%
2017	78,629	+0.78%
2023	82,579	+0.82%
Source: SPLAF and INSEE (1967-2023)

== Cantons ==
The commune of Le Tampon has been divided into two cantons since the canton reorganisation of March 2015. Their seat is in Le Tampon.

Name	Population (2019)	Cantonal Code
Canton of Le Tampon-1	40,342	97424
Canton of Le Tampon-2	39,482	97425

== See also ==
- Communes of the Réunion department
