= Pas de Bellecombe-Jacob =

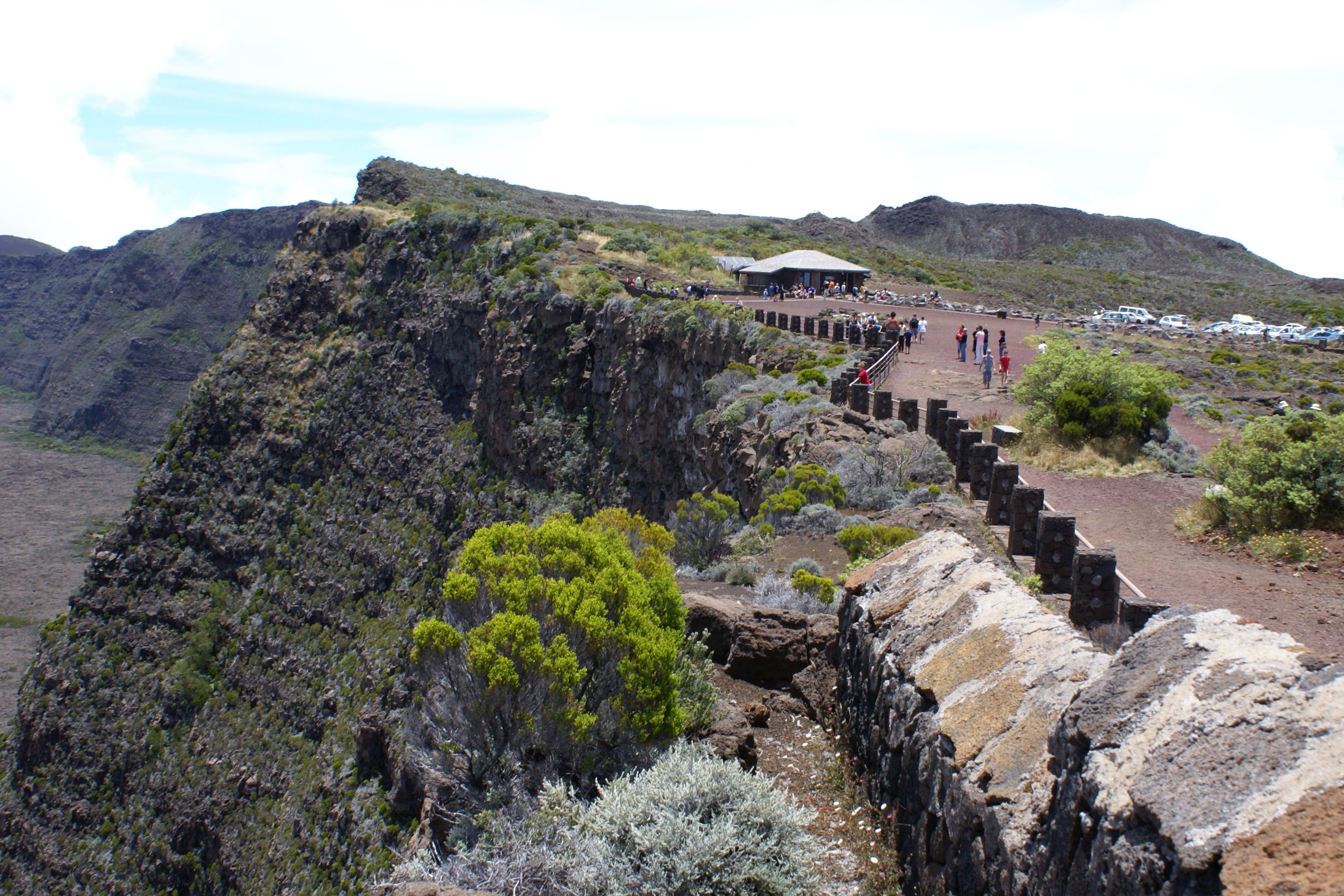
- Parking lot at Pas de Bellecombe-Jacob

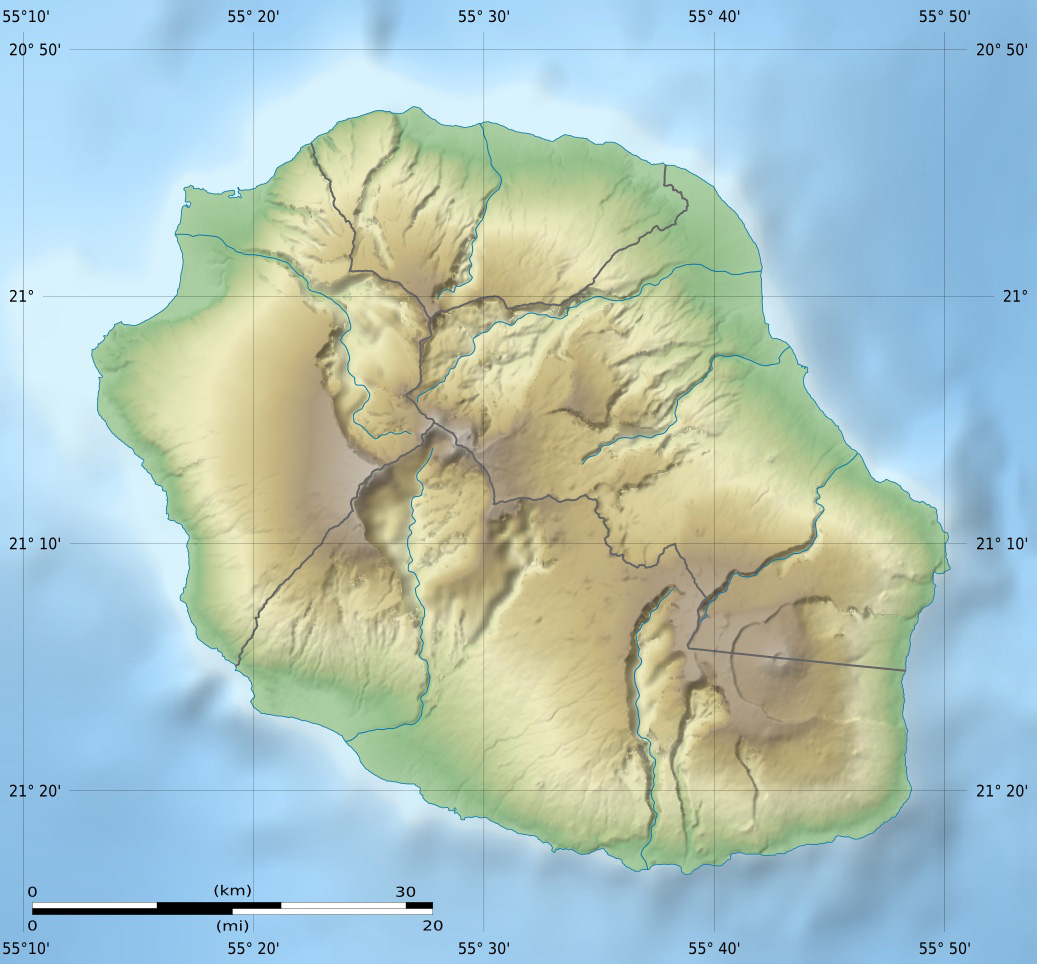
- Location within Réunion
- Elevation: 2,311 m (7,582 ft)

Third Approach
- Location: Réunion, Indian Ocean
- Range: Piton de la Fournaise
- Coordinates: 21°13′20″S 55°41′20″E

Pas de Bellecombe-Jacob is a mountain pass and vista point overlooking Enclos Fouqué, the last caldera formed by Piton de la Fournaise, the active volcano on the eastern side of Réunion island (a French department) in the Indian Ocean.

It is named after Guillaume Léonard de Bellecombe, governor of La Réunion during the 18th century, and Jacob, the slave that actually discovered the pass.

== Location ==
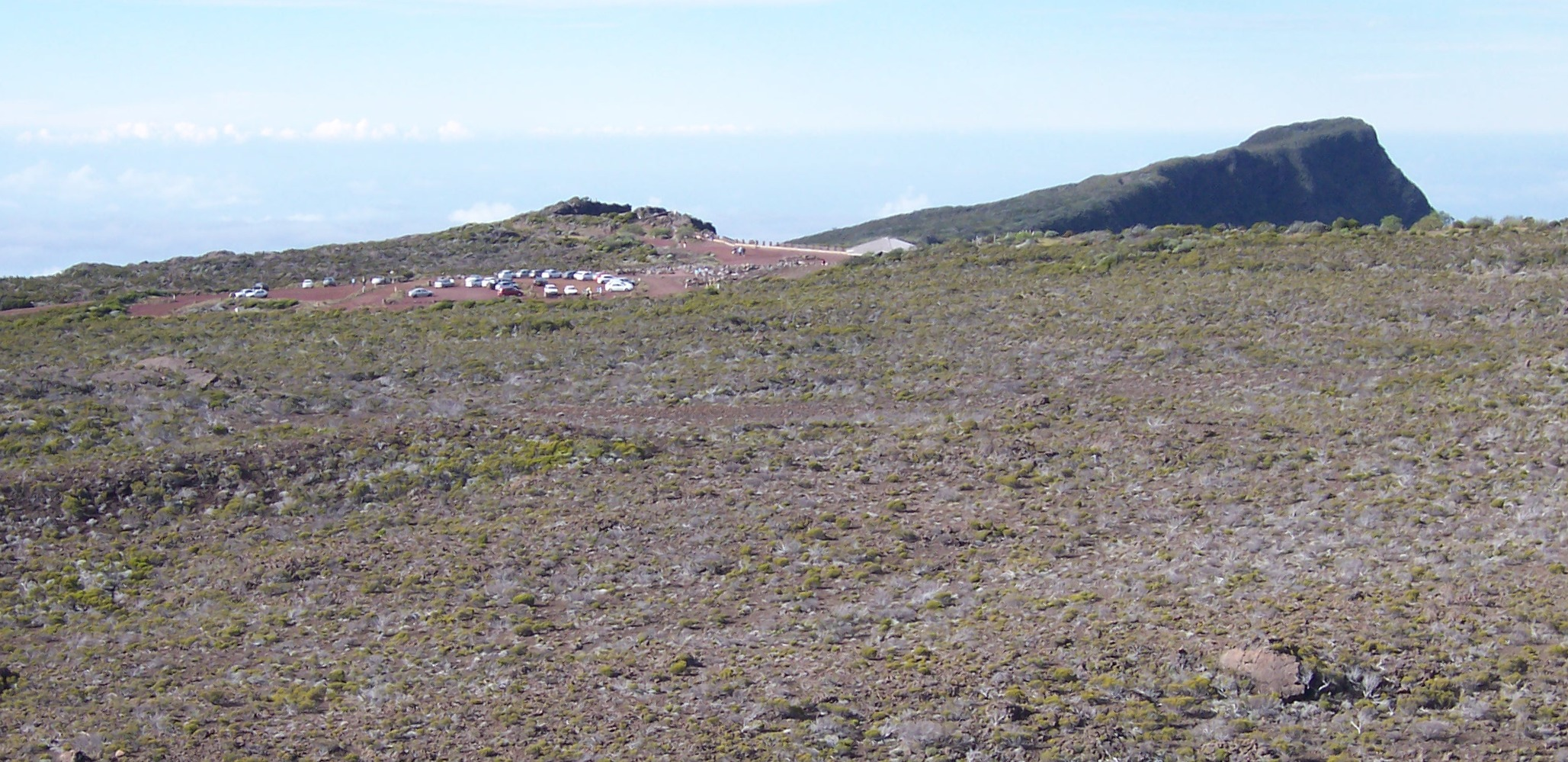
The parking lot at Pas de Bellecombe.

The Pas de Bellecombe is situated over the caldera rim cliffs, at a 2,311 m (7,582 ft) elevation, and offers a good point of view over the northeast part of the caldera, including a small crater called Formica Leo.

== Climate ==
Climate data for Bellecombe-Jacob, Réunion (1991-2020 normals, extremes 1968–present)
Month	Jan	Feb	Mar	Apr	May	Jun	Jul	Aug	Sep	Oct	Nov	Dec	Year
Record high °C (°F)	25.4 (77.7)	24.1 (75.4)	24.2 (75.6)	23.9 (75.0)	22.2 (72.0)	23.1 (73.6)	21.2 (70.2)	23.4 (74.1)	23.0 (73.4)	24.6 (76.3)	25.0 (77.0)	24.7 (76.5)	25.4 (77.7)
Mean daily maximum °C (°F)	18.7 (65.7)	18.6 (65.5)	18.3 (64.9)	17.5 (63.5)	15.5 (59.9)	13.7 (56.7)	12.7 (54.9)	13.5 (56.3)	15.0 (59.0)	17.0 (62.6)	18.2 (64.8)	18.7 (65.7)	16.4 (61.5)
Daily mean °C (°F)	14.2 (57.6)	14.4 (57.9)	13.9 (57.0)	13.0 (55.4)	11.0 (51.8)	9.0 (48.2)	8.1 (46.6)	8.5 (47.3)	9.6 (49.3)	11.4 (52.5)	12.6 (54.7)	13.5 (56.3)	11.6 (52.9)
Mean daily minimum °C (°F)	9.7 (49.5)	10.2 (50.4)	9.6 (49.3)	8.5 (47.3)	6.6 (43.9)	4.4 (39.9)	3.6 (38.5)	3.5 (38.3)	4.2 (39.6)	5.8 (42.4)	7.0 (44.6)	8.4 (47.1)	6.8 (44.2)
Record low °C (°F)	2.2 (36.0)	3.7 (38.7)	3.2 (37.8)	1.0 (33.8)	0.0 (32.0)	−1.8 (28.8)	−3.3 (26.1)	−3.7 (25.3)	−5.0 (23.0)	−1.9 (28.6)	−0.3 (31.5)	1.9 (35.4)	−5.0 (23.0)
Average precipitation mm (inches)	781.1 (30.75)	890.8 (35.07)	899.8 (35.43)	472.3 (18.59)	397.8 (15.66)	234.1 (9.22)	262.8 (10.35)	197.6 (7.78)	137.4 (5.41)	106.1 (4.18)	144.9 (5.70)	358.5 (14.11)	4,883.2 (192.25)
Average precipitation days (≥ 1 mm)	19.5	19.3	19.6	18.1	16.6	16.1	17.8	15.5	13.0	10.3	9.9	14.5	190.3
Mean monthly sunshine hours	181.7	150.0	179.1	180.3	195.7	212.9	213.7	216.1	229.2	240.8	241.8	195.6	2,436.7
Percentage possible sunshine	45	42	48	52	57	66	64	62	64	62	62	48	56
Source: Météo-France (sunshine 1986-2004)
