= Arrondissement of Saint-Benoît =

Coordinates: 21°02′42″S 55°43′04″E

Saint-Benoît
- Arrondissement
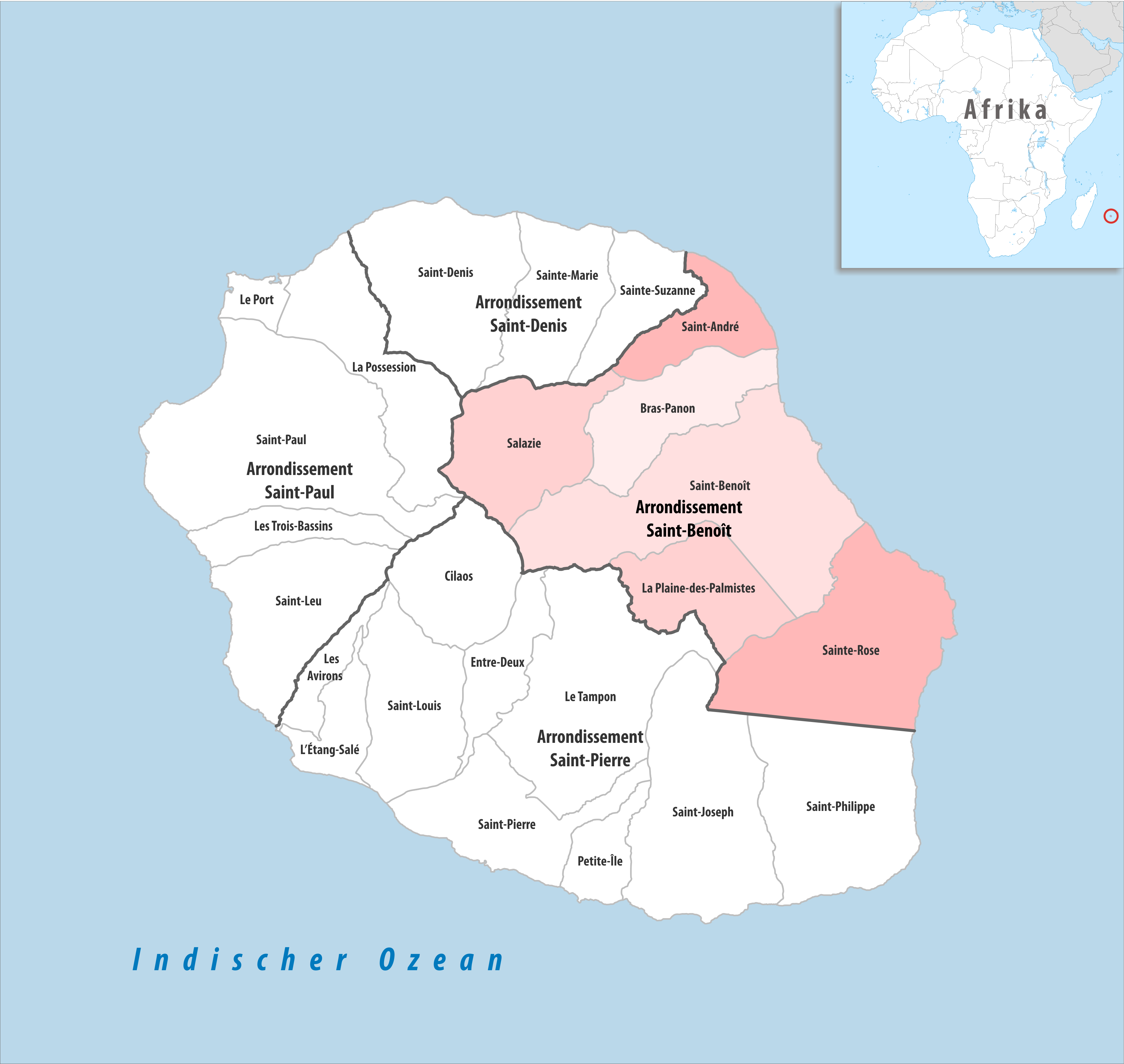
- Location within Réunion
- Country: France
- Overseas region and department: Réunion{{{region}}}
- No. of communes: {{{nbcomm}}}
- Area: 735.8 km^{2} (284.1 sq mi)
- Population (2023): 131,262
  - Density: 178.4/km^{2} (462.0/sq mi)
- INSEE code: 9743

The arrondissement of Saint-Benoît is an arrondissement of France in the Réunion department in the Réunion region. It has six communes. Its population is 127,924 (2021), and its area is 735.8 km^{2} (284.1 sq mi).

== Composition ==
The communes of the arrondissement of Saint-Benoît, and their INSEE codes, are:

1. Bras-Panon (97402)
2. La Plaine-des-Palmistes (97406)
3. Saint-André (97409)
4. Saint-Benoît (97410)
5. Sainte-Rose (97419)
6. Salazie (97421)

== History ==
The arrondissement of Saint-Benoît, containing six communes that were previously part of the arrondissement of Saint-Denis, was created in 1968.

As a result of the reorganisation of the cantons of France which came into effect in 2015, the borders of the cantons are no longer related to the borders of the arrondissements. The cantons of the arrondissement of Saint-Benoît were, as of January 2015:

1. Bras-Panon
2. La Plaine-des-Palmistes
3. Saint-André-1
4. Saint-André-2
5. Saint-André-3
6. Saint-Benoît-1
7. Saint-Benoît-2
8. Sainte-Rose
9. Salazie
