= Sainte-Suzanne =

Sainte-Suzanne may refer to a number of saints named Suzanne, or:

== Places in France ==
- Sainte-Suzanne, Ariège, a municipality in the Ariège department
- Sainte-Suzanne, Doubs, a municipality in the Doubs department
- Sainte-Suzanne, Mayenne, a municipality in the Mayenne department
- Sainte-Suzanne, Pyrénées-Atlantiques, a village in the municipality of Orthez, Pyrénées-Atlantiques department
- Sainte-Suzanne, Réunion, a municipality on Réunion Island
- Sainte-Suzanne-sur-Vire, a municipality in the Manche department

== Places in Haiti ==
- Sainte-Suzanne, Nord-Est, commune in the Nord-Est department of Haiti

== People ==
- Gilles-Joseph-Martin Bruneteau Saint-Suzanne (1760–1830), a French Revolutionary and Napoleonic general
- Jean-Chrysostôme Bruneteau de Sainte-Suzanne (1773–1830), French Revolutionary and Napoleonic general

== Other uses ==
- Sainte-Suzanne river, a river feeding the Niagara Falls on Réunion Island
