= Bras-Panon =

Commune in Réunion, France

- Commune
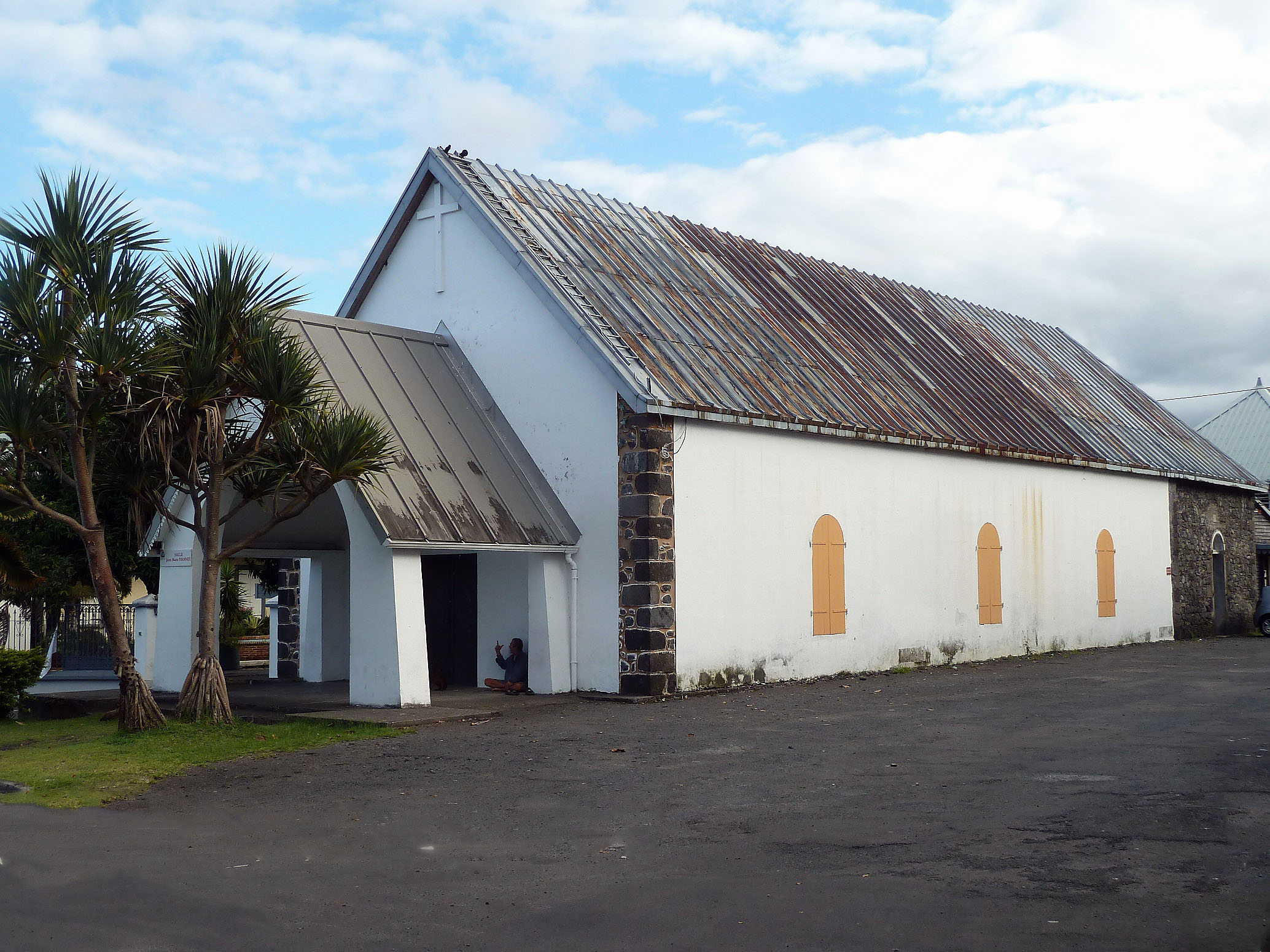

- Coat of arms

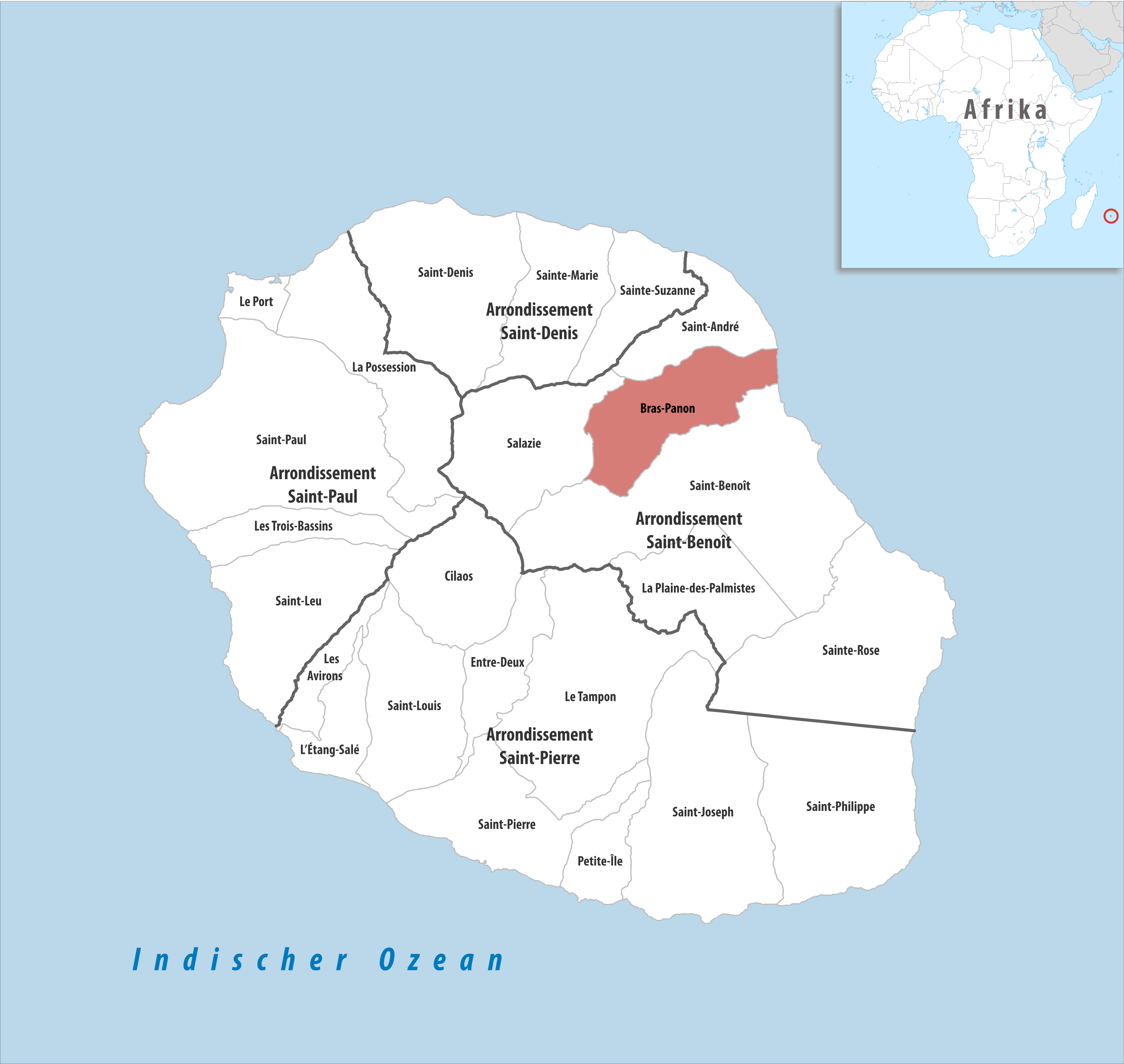
- Location of Bras-Panon
- Location within France
- Coordinates: 20°59′43″S 55°40′34″E
- Country: France
- Overseas region and department: Réunion
- Arrondissement: Saint-Benoît
- Canton: Saint-André-3
- Intercommunality: Réunion Est

Government
  - Mayor (2020–2026): Jeannick Atchapa
- Area^{1}: 88.55 km^{2} (34.19 sq mi)
- Elevation: 52 m (171 ft)
- Highest elevation: 2,092 m (6,864 ft)
- Lowest elevation: 0 m (0 ft)
- Population (2023): 13,012
  - Density: 146.9/km^{2} (380.6/sq mi)
- Time zone: UTC+04:00
- INSEE/Postal code: 97402 /97412
- ^{1} French Land Register data, which excludes lakes, ponds, glaciers > 1 km^{2} (0.386 sq mi or 247 acres) and river estuaries.

Bras-Panon (French pronunciation: [bʁa panɔ̃]) is a commune on the Indian Ocean island of Réunion, which is an overseas department and region of France. Bras-Panon borders the communes of Saint-André, Saint-Benoît and Salazie; as well as the Mât river, the Rivière des Roches and the Indian Ocean.

The commune is a large producer of vanilla, and holds the largest Agricultural Show on the island, every May.

== Geography ==
=== Climate ===
Bras-Panon has a tropical rainforest climate (Köppen climate classification Af). The average annual temperature in Bras-Panon is 20.8 °C (69.4 °F). The average annual rainfall is 4,665.2 mm (183.67 in) with February as the wettest month. The temperatures are highest on average in February, at around 23.7 °C (74.7 °F), and lowest in August, at around 18.0 °C (64.4 °F). The highest temperature ever recorded in Bras-Panon was 32.4 °C (90.3 °F) on 13 February 2018; the coldest temperature ever recorded was 10.5 °C (50.9 °F) on 2 July 2005.

Climate data for Bras-Panon (1991−2020 normals, extremes 1990−present)
Month	Jan	Feb	Mar	Apr	May	Jun	Jul	Aug	Sep	Oct	Nov	Dec	Year
Record high °C (°F)	31.5 (88.7)	32.4 (90.3)	32.2 (90.0)	30.5 (86.9)	28.8 (83.8)	28.1 (82.6)	26.7 (80.1)	26.3 (79.3)	27.2 (81.0)	28.4 (83.1)	29.8 (85.6)	31.1 (88.0)	32.4 (90.3)
Mean daily maximum °C (°F)	26.5 (79.7)	26.8 (80.2)	26.3 (79.3)	25.5 (77.9)	23.8 (74.8)	22.0 (71.6)	21.0 (69.8)	21.1 (70.0)	21.7 (71.1)	22.8 (73.0)	24.2 (75.6)	25.7 (78.3)	24.0 (75.2)
Daily mean °C (°F)	23.4 (74.1)	23.7 (74.7)	23.3 (73.9)	22.4 (72.3)	20.7 (69.3)	19.0 (66.2)	18.0 (64.4)	18.0 (64.4)	18.5 (65.3)	19.6 (67.3)	20.9 (69.6)	22.5 (72.5)	20.8 (69.4)
Mean daily minimum °C (°F)	20.4 (68.7)	20.7 (69.3)	20.2 (68.4)	19.3 (66.7)	17.7 (63.9)	16.0 (60.8)	15.1 (59.2)	15.0 (59.0)	15.3 (59.5)	16.4 (61.5)	17.6 (63.7)	19.2 (66.6)	17.7 (63.9)
Record low °C (°F)	17.1 (62.8)	17.4 (63.3)	16.8 (62.2)	15.7 (60.3)	11.5 (52.7)	12.4 (54.3)	10.5 (50.9)	11.1 (52.0)	11.4 (52.5)	10.9 (51.6)	12.0 (53.6)	15.0 (59.0)	10.5 (50.9)
Average precipitation mm (inches)	637.7 (25.11)	738.2 (29.06)	653.6 (25.73)	409.8 (16.13)	349.9 (13.78)	264.2 (10.40)	254.0 (10.00)	254.3 (10.01)	222.1 (8.74)	213.7 (8.41)	241.2 (9.50)	426.5 (16.79)	4,665.2 (183.67)
Average precipitation days (≥ 1.0 mm)	21.5	19.4	20.7	18.7	17.2	15.1	17.3	17.6	16.5	16.6	15.1	19.2	214.9
Source: Météo-France

== Population ==
Historical population
Year	Pop.	±% p.a.
1967	5,533	—
1974	5,941	+1.02%
1982	6,945	+1.97%
1990	8,455	+2.49%
1999	9,683	+1.52%
2007	11,216	+1.85%
2012	12,298	+1.86%
2017	12,811	+0.82%
2023	13,012	+0.26%
Source: INSEE

== See also ==
- Communes of the Réunion department
