= Anne Chrétien Louis de Hell =

French admiral and governor

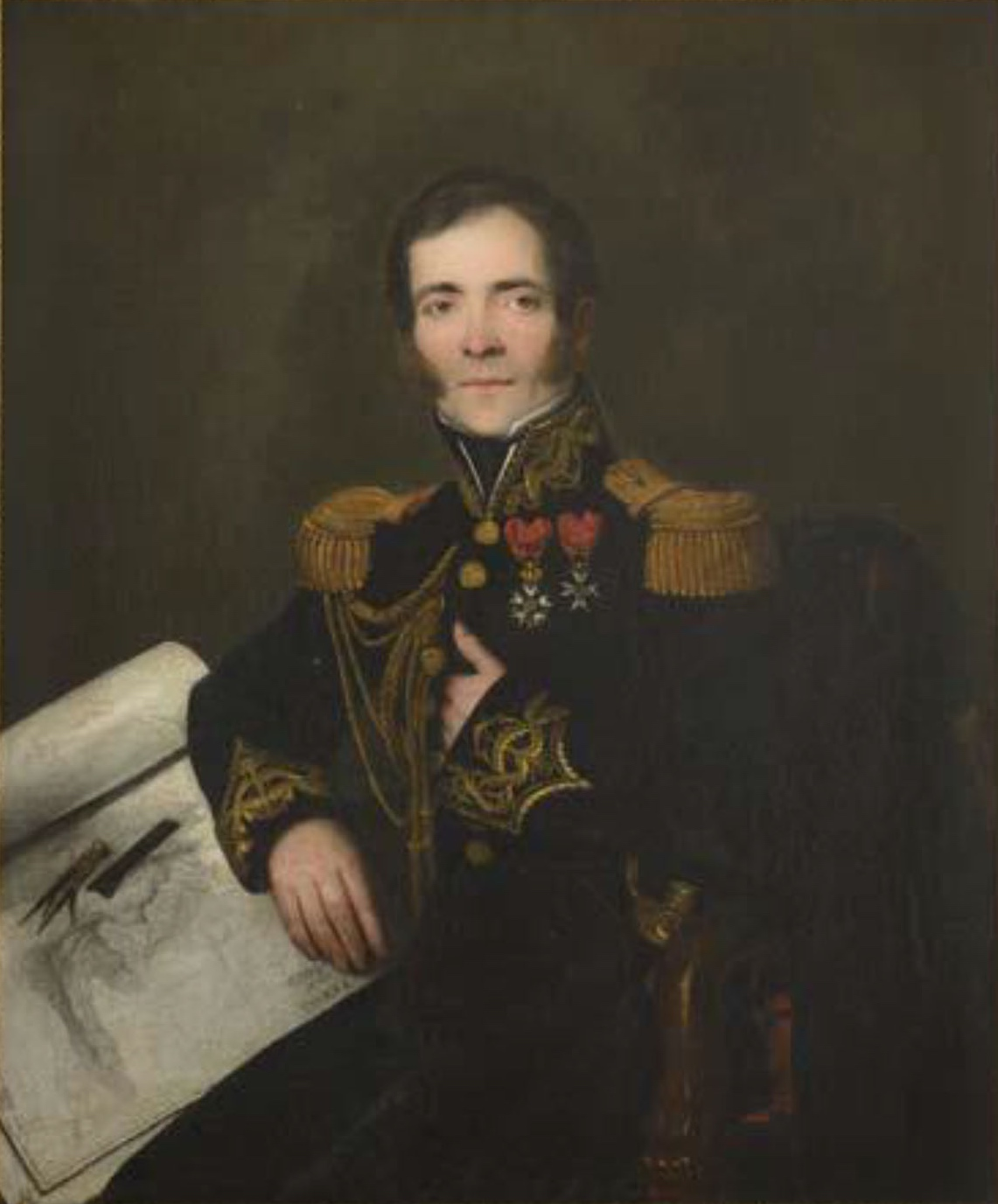
Anne Chrétien Louis de Hell

Anne Chrétien Louis de Hell (French pronunciation: [an kʁetjɛ̃ lwi də el]; 25 August 1783 – 1864) was a French admiral and the governor of the Isle de Bourbon in the Indian Ocean – now known as the French overseas department of Réunion – from May 1838 to October 1841.

== History ==
=== Early career ===
Born in Verneuil-sur-Seine, as a promising young nobleman, he received his first military commission as a sub-lieutenant at the age of six (not totally unheard of at the time) and was sent by his family to a friend at Brest during the upheavals of the French Revolution. There, it was considered that it would be safest – and best for his education as a young officer – to send him on a warship. In this position as a junior officer, he apparently conducted himself well, and historians of the time as well as family documents praise his skill, intelligence and charisma. After rising up to rear admiral rank during the wars of the First Empire, he became commander of the École Navale (naval academy) at Brest (a mostly administrative post, as all actual training occurred at sea), before being named governor of the Isle de Bourbon.

=== Isle de Bourbon ===
During his short tenure on Reunion, one of his main challenges was to smooth the difficulties associated with the slave emancipation pushed forward by the French homeland. As a slave-based plantation-society, there was considerable resistance from the local landholder class, though de Hell apparently enjoyed some success in his transition work. At the time of his departure, he had the admiration of much of the local populace, a regard he apparently returned. He is known to have been especially impressed with the Cirque de Salazie. The Reunion village of Hell-Bourg is named after him, as is Hell-Ville on Nosy-Be, Madagascar (there is also a gastropod named after him, Strombus hellii, discovered by Kiener in 1843).

=== Return to France ===
Returning to France, he received the post of the Préfet Maritime de Cherbourg. Later on, he was elected the Strasbourg member of the Chambre des députés and finally Président du conseil général (roughly analogous to provincial governor) of Bas-Rhin. In 1847, he was named to lead the Direction générale des cartes et plans de la marine (naval cartography office). He died in 1864 at the age of 81 at his ancestral castle near Oberkirch, and even though over 20 years had gone by since his governorship, Réunion records note that a large number of locals turned out to mourn him.
