= Hôtel de Ville, Sainte-Suzanne, Réunion =

Town hall in Sainte-Suzanne, Réunion, France

Hôtel de Ville
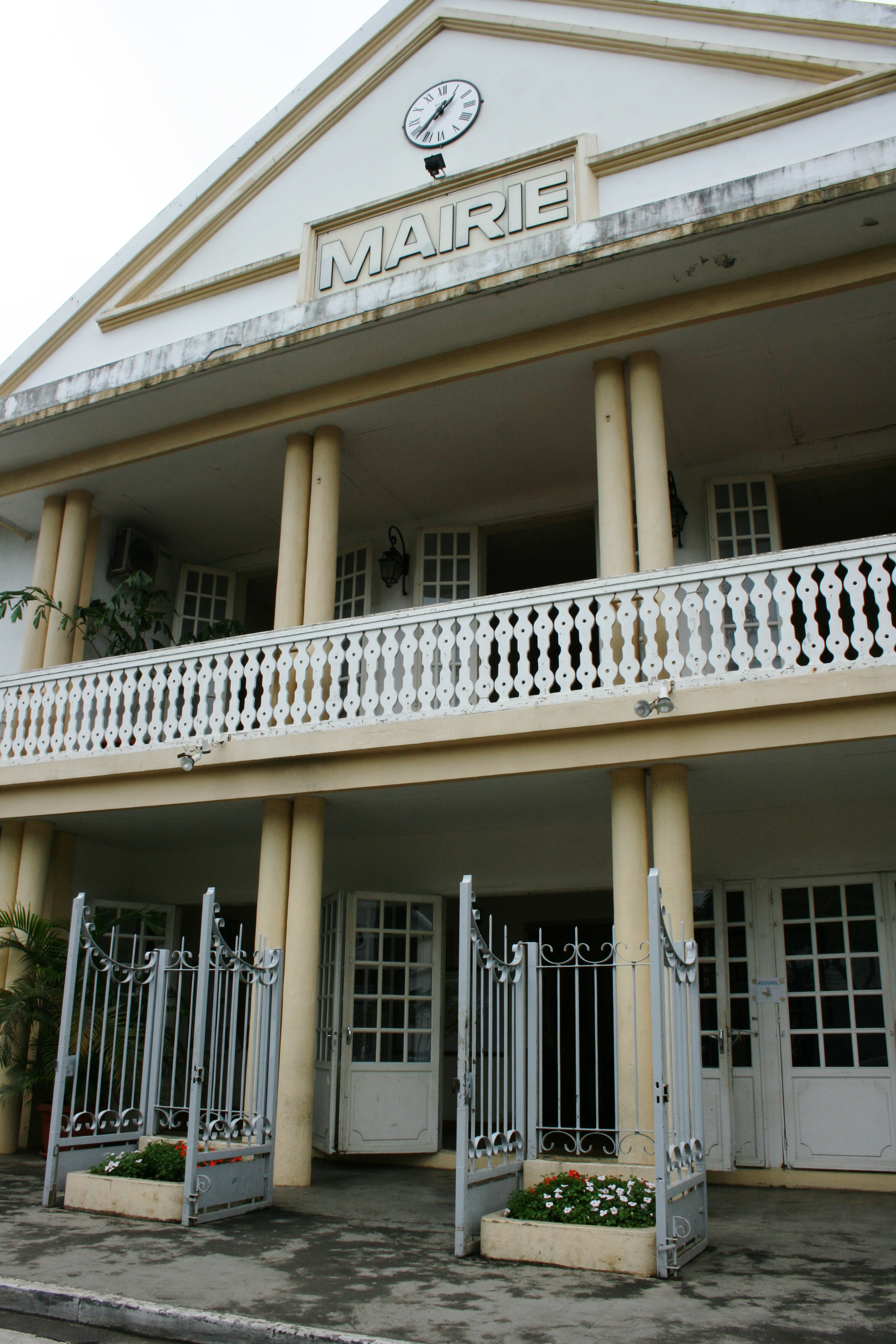
- The main frontage of the Hôtel de Ville in April 2009
- Interactive map of the Hôtel de Ville area

General information
- Type: City hall
- Architectural style: Neoclassical style
- Location: Sainte-Suzanne, Réunion, France
- Coordinates: 20.9055°S 55.6075°E
- Completed: 1847

The Hôtel de Ville (French pronunciation: [otɛl də vil], City Hall) is a municipal building in Sainte-Suzanne, Réunion, in the Indian Ocean, standing on Rue du Général-de-Gaulle.

== History ==
Following the French Revolution, the town was elevated to the status of a commune in 1790, and the town council decided to establish its own town hall. However, by the mid-19th century, the building was inadequate and, in around 1845, the council decided to rebuild it. At this time, there were at least 15 sugar producers operating in Sainte-Suzanne. This industrial production was supported by a large influx of indentured workers from South India known as the Malbars.

In the context of this large increase in population, the council led by the mayor, Augustin Eugène Desprez, decided to commission a new town hall. The site they selected was on the north side of what became Rue Desprez. The new building was designed in the neoclassical style, built in brick with a cement render finish and was completed in around 1847.

The design involved a symmetrical main frontage of five bays facing onto Rue Desprez. The central section of three bays contained three square headed doorways, which were recessed under a canopy supported by iron poles: on the first floor, there were three French doors, which were also recessed in a similar way, creating a balcony. The outer bays were fenestrated by casement windows with shutters on both floors and, at roof level, there was a cornice. Above the central section, there was a pediment with a clock in the tympanum. Internally, the principal room was the Salle du Conseil (council chamber), later renamed the Salle Lucet Langenier (Lucet Langenier Room) to commemorate the life of a former mayor.

A sculpture formed by three child-like figures supporting a bowl and known as the Fontaine des Trois Amours (Fountain of the Three Loves) was subsequently installed in front of the building. A war memorial created by the sculptor, Eugène Paul Bénet, in the former of a figure of a soldier on a pedestal was also installed in front of the building after the First World War.

In January 2014, the council announced the appointment of a developer, Sodiac, to regenerate the area around the town hall.
