= Étienne Regnault =

First governor of Réunion (died 1688)

Etienne Regnault was the first governor of Réunion. He arrived on the island on 10 July 1665 on the ship Taureau with a group of 20 settlers sent by the French East India Company. He founded the towns of Sainte-Suzanne and Saint-Denis. Around these towns, he and the other settlers planted sugar cane and grape vines for wine making.

He served as governor of the colony until 1671, after which he was succeeded by Jacques de la Heure. Regnault continued his service to the East India Company in Surat and Pondicherry, until his death in 1688 in Bengal.
