= Bridal Veil Falls (Salazie) =

Voile de la Mariée
- Bridal Veil Falls
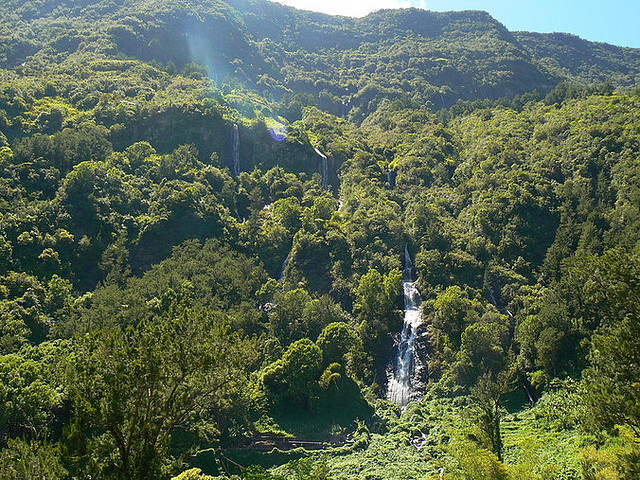
- General view of the Bridal Veil

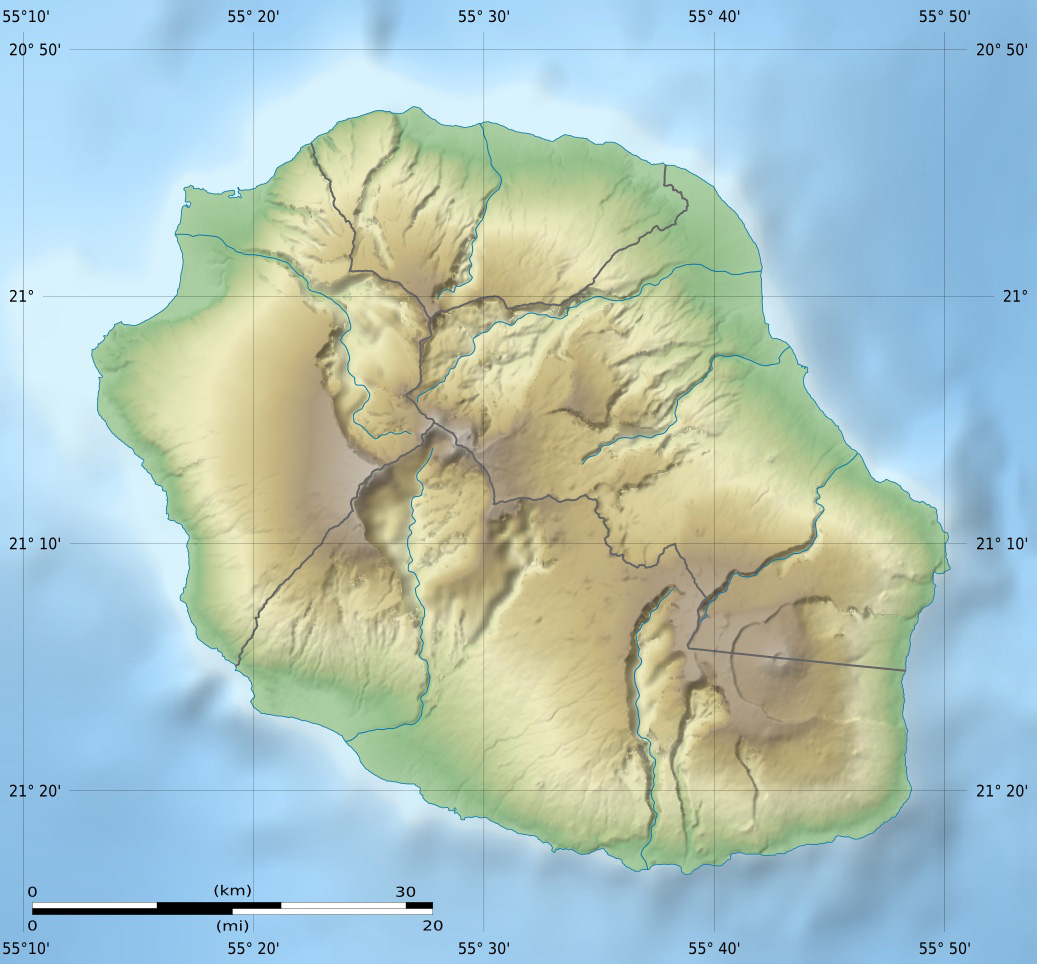
- Location within Réunion
- Location: Réunion (France)
- Coordinates: 21°02′24″S 55°32′18″E
- Elevation: ~ 520 m
- Watercourse: Branch of the Rivière du Mât

The Bridal Veil Falls (French: Voile de la Mariée) is a waterfall on the island of Réunion. Located at about 500 m altitude along the mountainous rampart that separates the cirque Salazie and the plateau forest Bélouve, it falls within the territory of the commune of Salazie on the island of Réunion. A legend related to it: a father crying on the veil of his daughter fell into a deep precipice.
