= La Plaine-des-Palmistes =

Commune in Réunion, France

- Commune
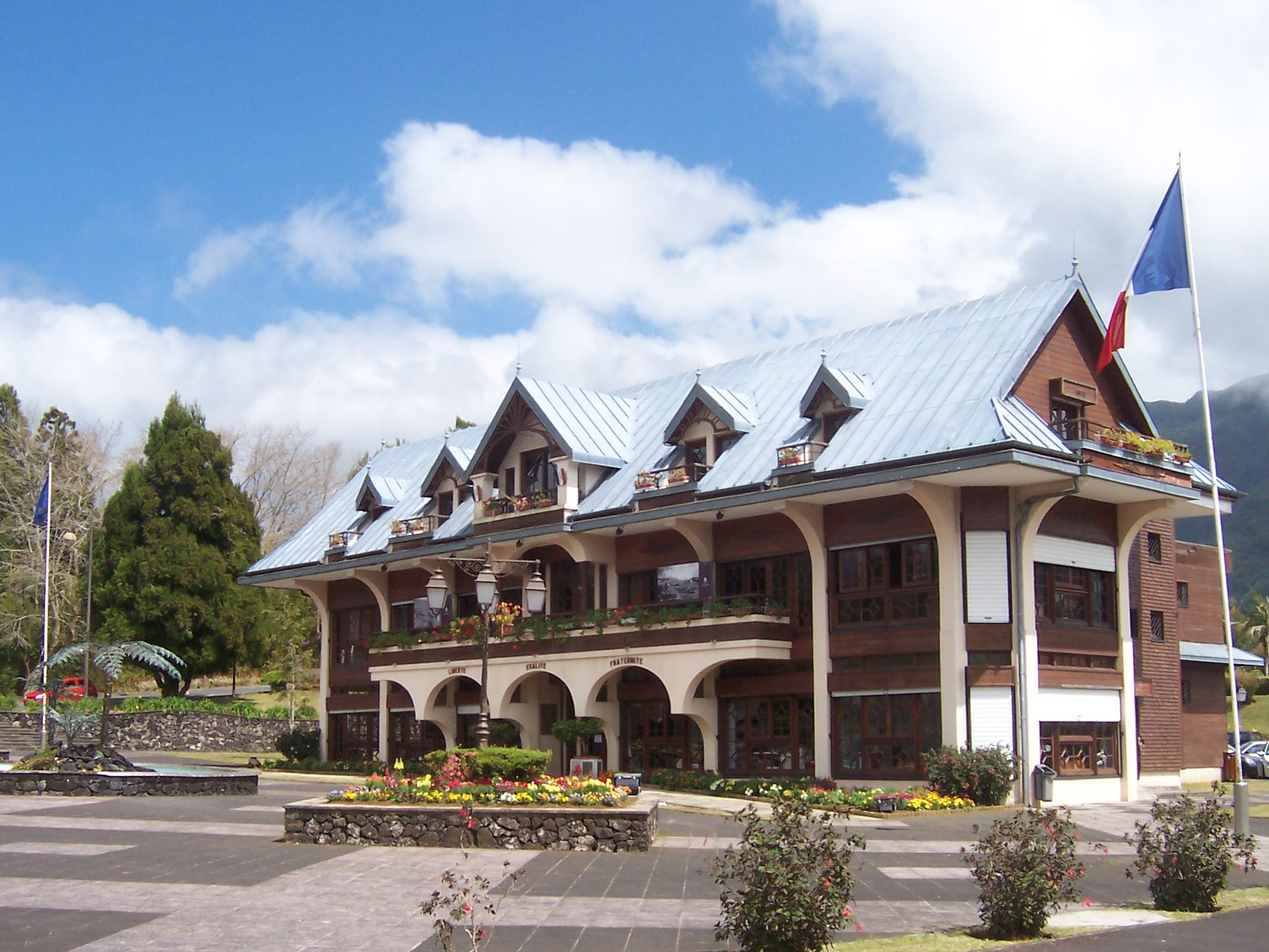
- The town hall in Plaine-des-Palmistes

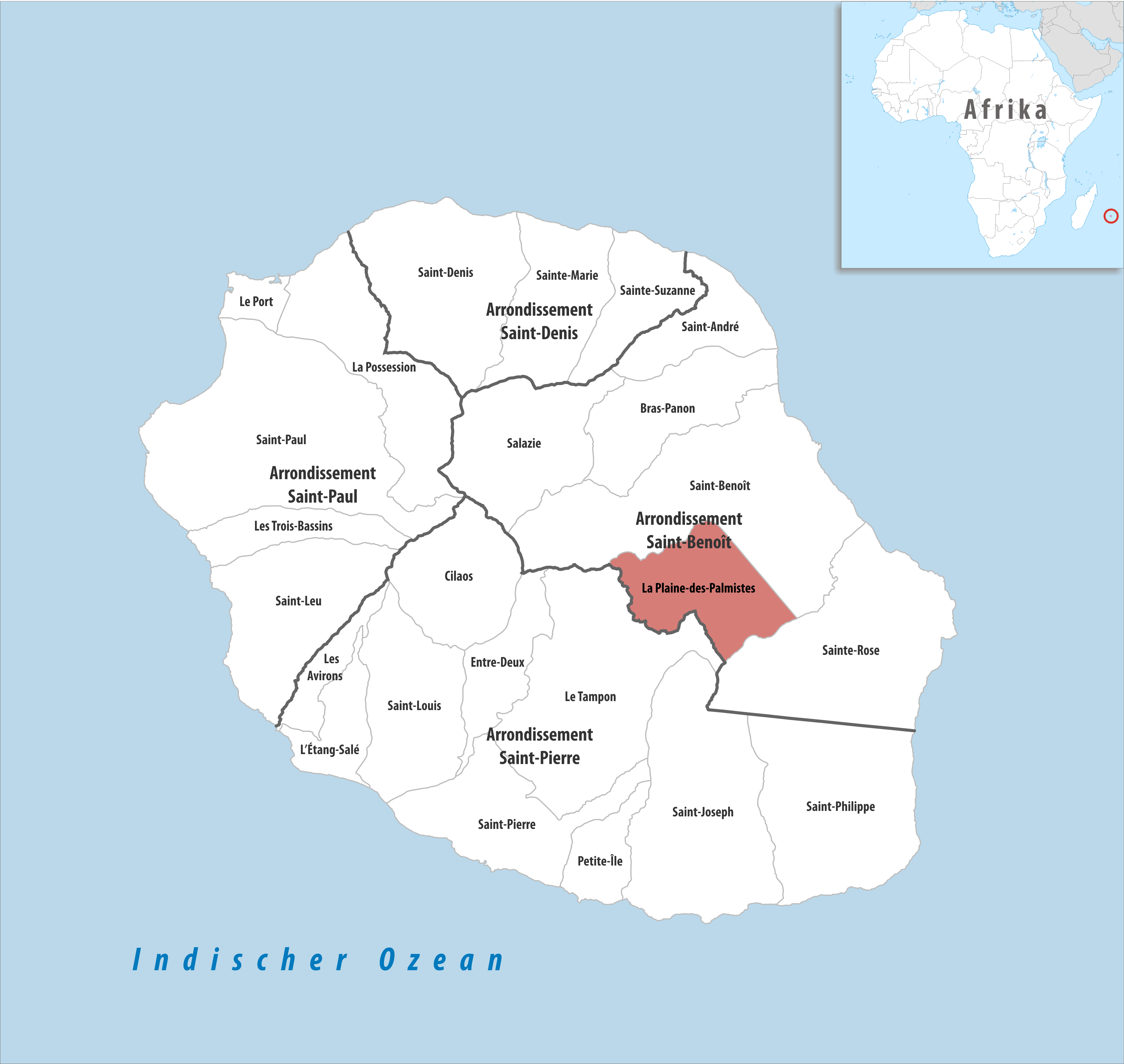
- Location of La Plaine-des-Palmistes
- Coordinates: 21°08′06″S 55°37′32″E
- Country: France
- Overseas region and department: Réunion
- Arrondissement: Saint-Benoît
- Canton: Saint-Benoît-1
- Intercommunality: Réunion Est

Government
  - Mayor (2020–2026): Johnny Payet
- Area^{1}: 83.19 km^{2} (32.12 sq mi)
- Elevation: 1,008 m (3,307 ft)
- Highest elevation: 2,402 m (7,881 ft)
- Lowest elevation: 720 m (2,360 ft)
- Population (2023): 6,936
  - Density: 83.38/km^{2} (215.9/sq mi)
- Time zone: UTC+04:00
- INSEE/Postal code: 97406 /97431
- ^{1} French Land Register data, which excludes lakes, ponds, glaciers > 1 km^{2} (0.386 sq mi or 247 acres) and river estuaries.

La Plaine-des-Palmistes (French pronunciation: [la plɛn də palmist]) is a commune in the French overseas department of Réunion. It lies in the eastern part of the island, on the RN3 road, south west of Saint-Benoît and northeast of the Col de Bellevue. It is known for its nearby forest and for the Biberon Falls. It lies close to the slopes of the Piton des Songes.

The communal territory is entirely located at the top of the island. It borders Saint-Benoît, Sainte-Rose and Le Tampon.

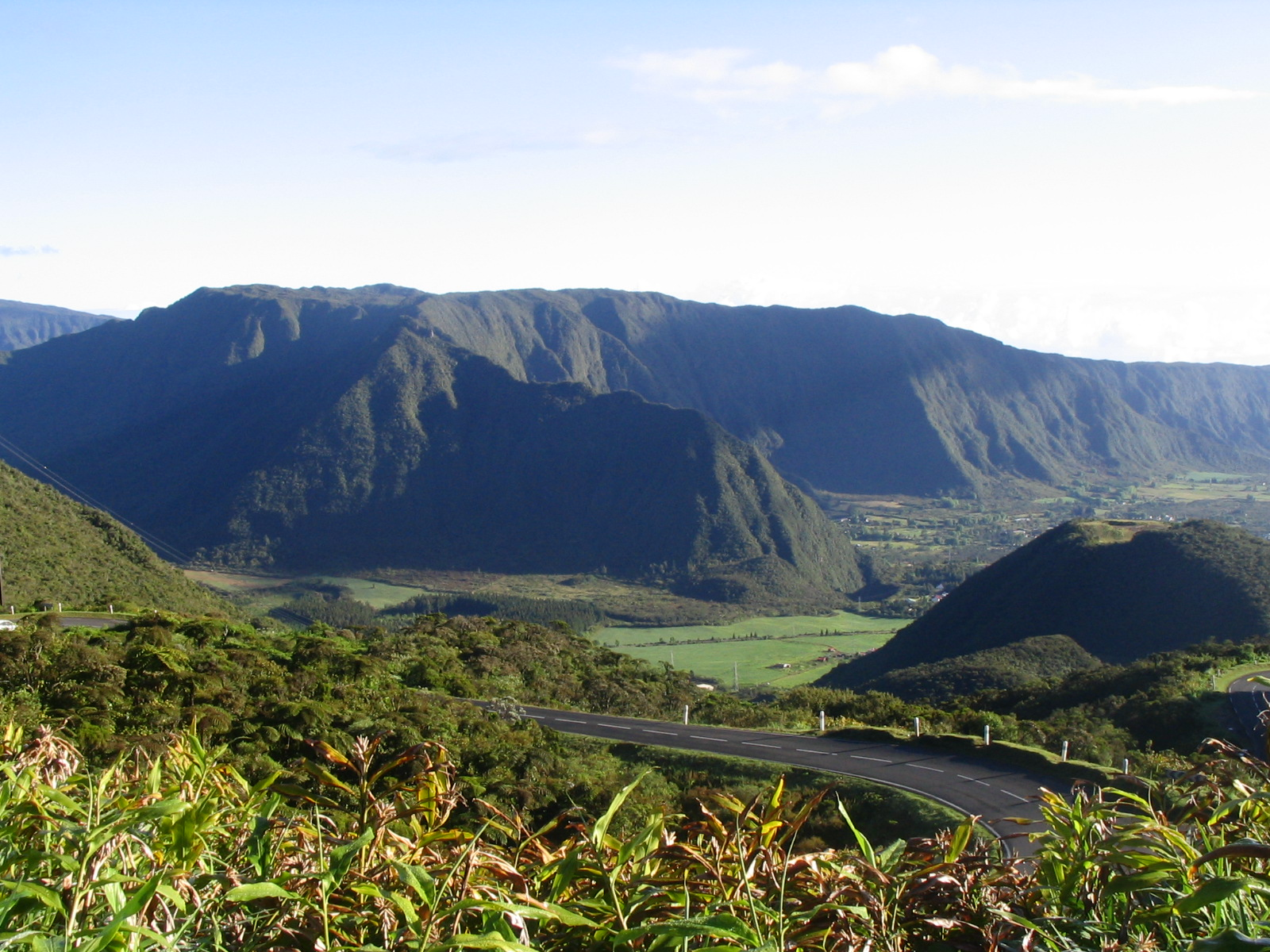
Plaine-des-Palmistes

== Climate ==
La Plaine-des-Palmistes has an oceanic climate (Cfb) while under the Trewartha system, it is labeled an humid subtropical climate (Dobk).

The average annual temperature in La Plaine-des-Palmistes is 16.9 °C (62.4 °F). The average annual rainfall is 4,302.4 mm (169.39 in) with February as the wettest month. The temperatures are highest on average in February, at around 20.2 °C (68.4 °F), and lowest in August, at around 13.8 °C (56.8 °F). The highest temperature ever recorded in La Plaine-des-Palmistes was 30.5 °C (86.9 °F) on 11 March 2015; the coldest temperature ever recorded was 2.8 °C (37.0 °F) on 25 August 1963.

Climate data for La Plaine-des-Palmistes (1991–2020 averages, extremes 1961–present)
Month	Jan	Feb	Mar	Apr	May	Jun	Jul	Aug	Sep	Oct	Nov	Dec	Year
Record high °C (°F)	29.0 (84.2)	30.2 (86.4)	30.5 (86.9)	28.5 (83.3)	26.1 (79.0)	25.3 (77.5)	24.0 (75.2)	23.1 (73.6)	24.2 (75.6)	26.8 (80.2)	28.5 (83.3)	28.1 (82.6)	30.5 (86.9)
Mean daily maximum °C (°F)	23.8 (74.8)	24.0 (75.2)	23.5 (74.3)	22.7 (72.9)	21.0 (69.8)	19.3 (66.7)	18.2 (64.8)	18.0 (64.4)	18.5 (65.3)	19.6 (67.3)	21.2 (70.2)	22.8 (73.0)	21.1 (70.0)
Daily mean °C (°F)	19.9 (67.8)	20.2 (68.4)	19.7 (67.5)	18.6 (65.5)	16.7 (62.1)	14.9 (58.8)	14.0 (57.2)	13.8 (56.8)	14.2 (57.6)	15.4 (59.7)	16.8 (62.2)	18.6 (65.5)	16.9 (62.4)
Mean daily minimum °C (°F)	16.0 (60.8)	16.4 (61.5)	15.8 (60.4)	14.6 (58.3)	12.5 (54.5)	10.6 (51.1)	9.7 (49.5)	9.6 (49.3)	10.0 (50.0)	11.2 (52.2)	12.4 (54.3)	14.5 (58.1)	12.8 (55.0)
Record low °C (°F)	10.0 (50.0)	9.5 (49.1)	9.8 (49.6)	7.4 (45.3)	5.2 (41.4)	3.8 (38.8)	3.4 (38.1)	2.8 (37.0)	4.5 (40.1)	4.9 (40.8)	5.6 (42.1)	8.1 (46.6)	2.8 (37.0)
Average precipitation mm (inches)	763.7 (30.07)	780.8 (30.74)	733.5 (28.88)	344.0 (13.54)	262.7 (10.34)	189.1 (7.44)	162.2 (6.39)	188.5 (7.42)	166.1 (6.54)	158.1 (6.22)	179.0 (7.05)	374.7 (14.75)	4,302.4 (169.39)
Average precipitation days (≥ 1.0 mm)	20.9	19.7	19.3	17.1	15.2	13.4	15.3	16.1	13.9	14.4	13.8	17.8	196.7
Mean monthly sunshine hours	125.3	111.6	131.3	128.1	133.6	136.6	136.6	130.1	137.8	126.9	137.0	119.1	1,553.9
Source 1: Meteo France
Source 2: Meteociel.fr (sunshine 1981-2010)

== Population ==
Historical population
Year	Pop.	±% p.a.
1967	2,304	—
1974	2,062	−1.57%
1982	2,020	−0.26%
1990	2,676	+3.58%
1999	3,434	+2.81%
2007	4,713	+4.04%
2012	5,574	+3.41%
2017	6,565	+3.33%
2023	6,936	+0.92%
Source: INSEE

== See also ==
- Communes of the Réunion department
