= Col de Bellevue =

Mountain pass in Réunion, France

Coordinates: 21°10′02″S 55°35′11″E

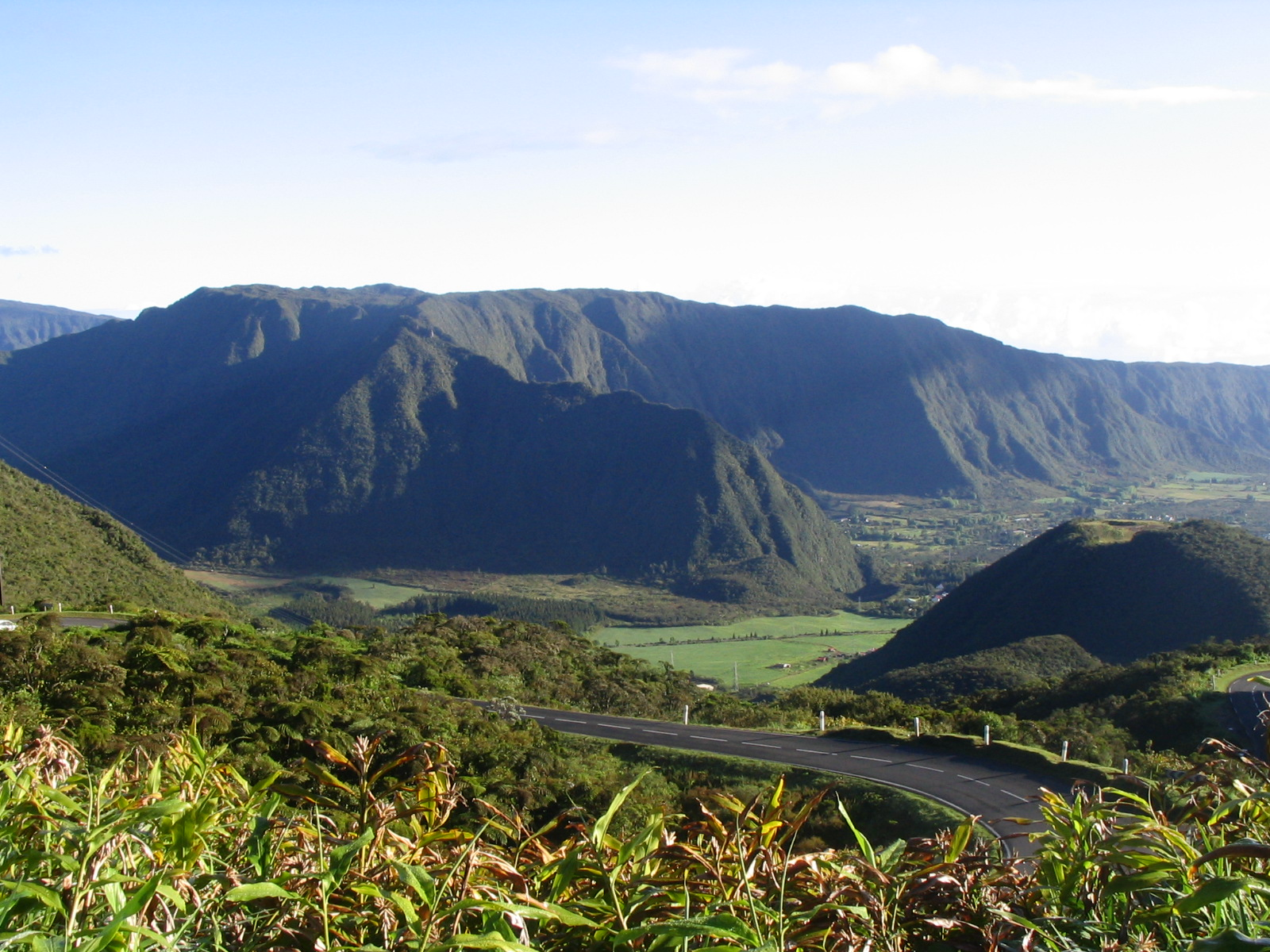
Col del Bellevue

The Col de Bellevue is a mountain pass on the RN3 road which runs across the Indian Ocean island of Réunion. At 1606 metres it is one of the highest road passes on the island, and lies between the villages of Bourg-Murat and La Plaine-des-Palmistes
