= Anchaing =

Anchaing (also spelled Enchaing) was a legendary maroon from the island of Réunion, celebrated in local folklore for his resistance to slavery and his life in the island's remote mountainous regions. Many versions of his story exist, often portraying him as a symbol of freedom and endurance. His name is commemorated in several geographic landmarks on the island, including Piton d'Anchaing.

== Allusions ==
The summit of a mountain in Salazie is named the Piton of Anchaing after the legend. Auguste Lacaussade recounted the legend of Anchaing in a poem in his collection Salazienne.

== Bibliography ==
- "Anchaing et Héva" (in French).

== Sources ==
- Graham M.S. Dann, "The Tourist as a Metaphor of the Social World", (2002, CABI; First edition; ISBN 978-0851996066)
