= Salazie =

Commune in Réunion, France

- Commune
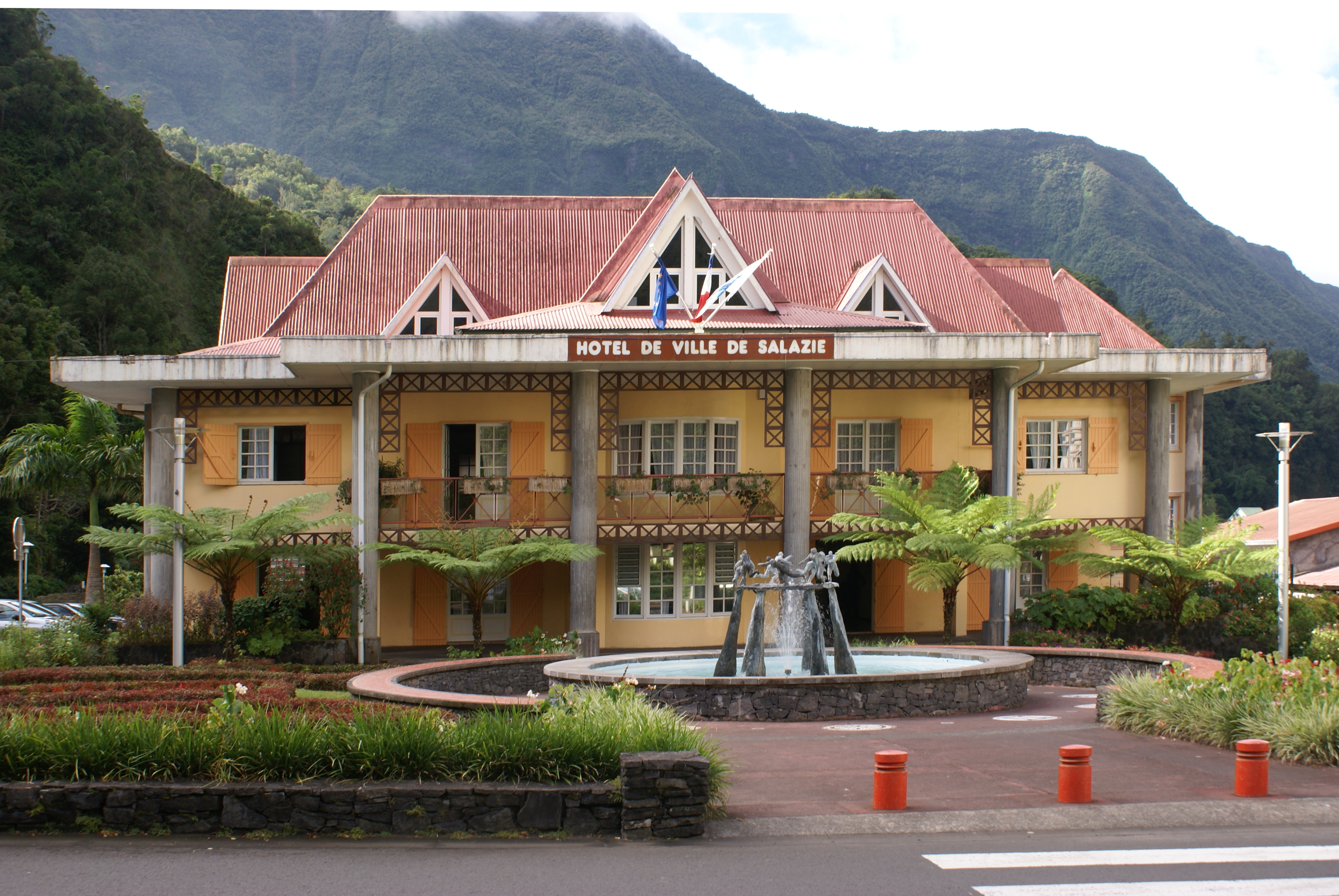
- Salazie town hall

- Coat of arms

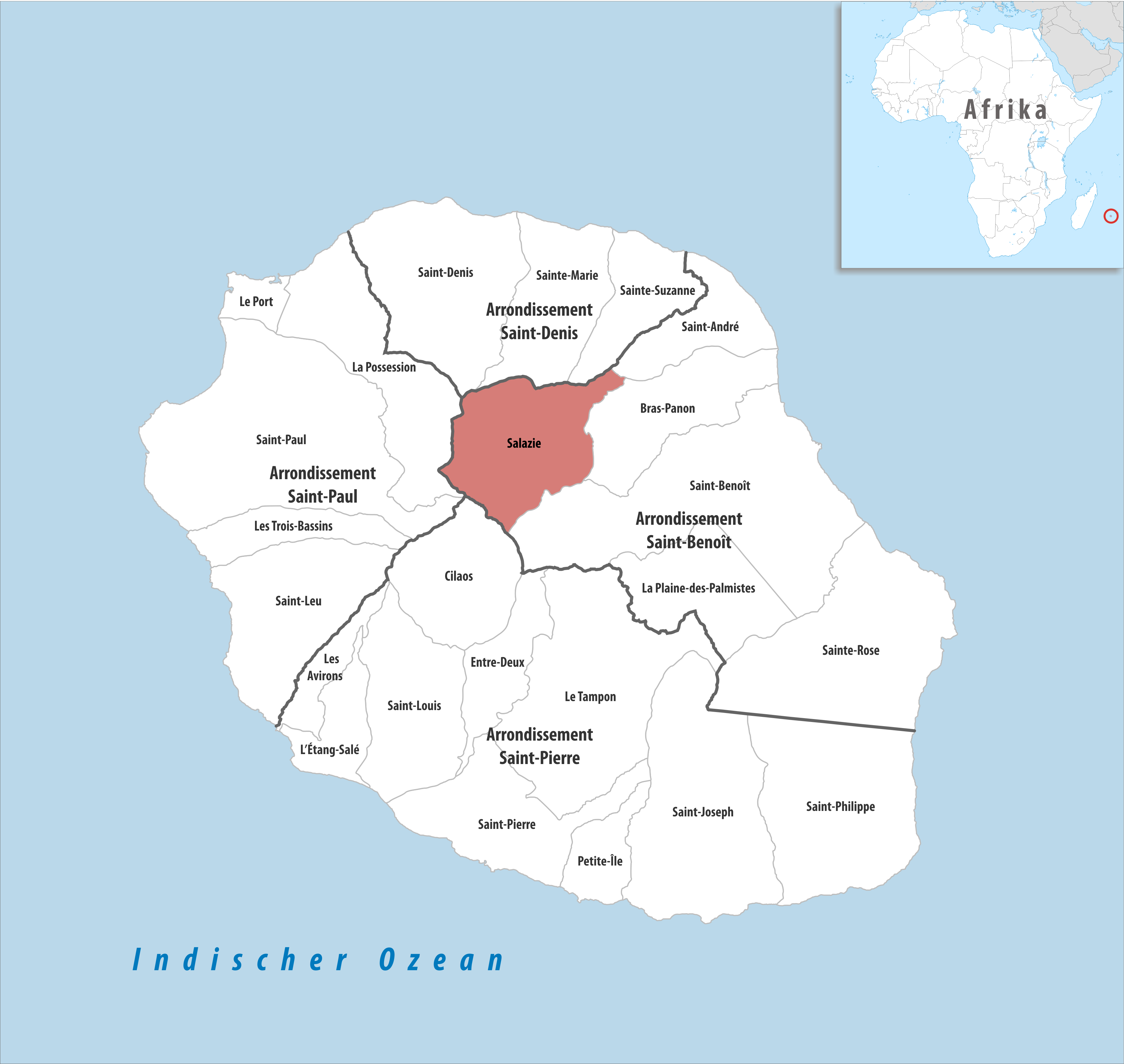
- Location of Salazie
- Coordinates: 21°01′39″S 55°32′24″E
- Country: France
- Overseas region and department: Réunion
- Arrondissement: Saint-Benoît
- Canton: Saint-André-3
- Intercommunality: Réunion Est

Government
  - Mayor (2023–2026): Sidoleine Papaya
- Area^{1}: 103.82 km^{2} (40.09 sq mi)
- Elevation: 446 m (1,463 ft)
- Highest elevation: 3,071 m (10,075 ft)
- Lowest elevation: 230 m (750 ft)
- Population (2023): 7,268
  - Density: 70.01/km^{2} (181.3/sq mi)
- Time zone: UTC+04:00
- INSEE/Postal code: 97421 /97433
- ^{1} French Land Register data, which excludes lakes, ponds, glaciers > 1 km^{2} (0.386 sq mi or 247 acres) and river estuaries.

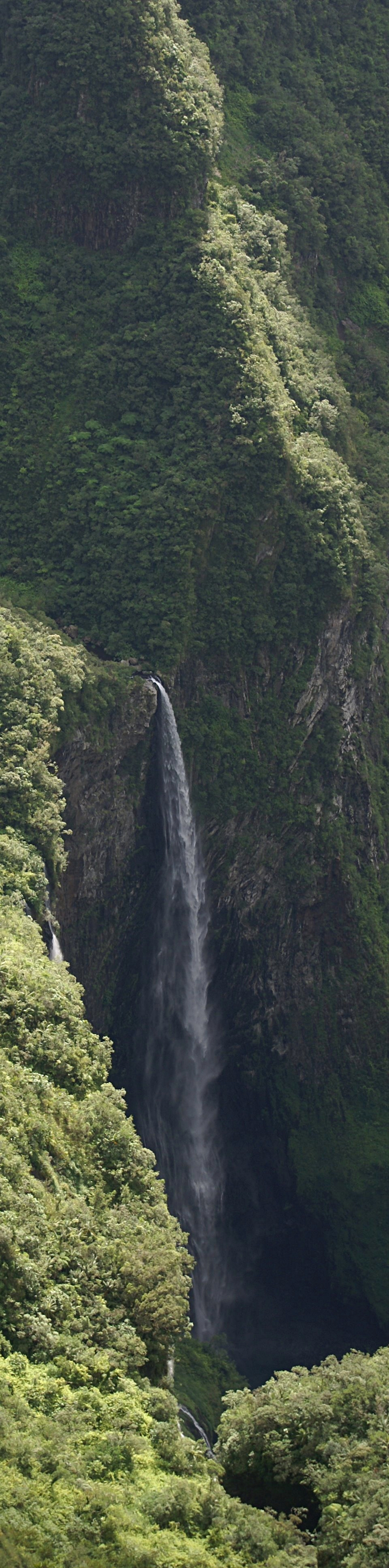
Waterfall of the Trou de fer

Salazie (French pronunciation: [salazi]) is a volcanic caldera and commune (administrative division) of the Indian Ocean island of Réunion, which is an overseas department and region of France.

The first settlement of the area took place in 1829 after a cyclone had devastated the nearby coast, and the municipality of Salazie was formed in 1889. The name of the commune is potentially derived from the Malagasy word salazy, meaning 'good encampment'.

== Geography ==
Salazie lies in the middle of island, north-east of Piton des Neiges (the highest point on the island), in the Cirque de Salazie (actually a volcanic caldera). The commune is totally landlocked, and borders the communes of Bras-Panon, Cilaos, La Possession, Saint-André, Saint-Benoît, Saint-Denis, Sainte-Marie and Sainte-Suzanne.

=== Climate ===
Salazie has a subtropical highland climate (Köppen climate classification Cfb). The average annual temperature in Salazie is 16.4 °C (61.5 °F). The average annual rainfall is 3,332.5 mm (131.20 in) with February as the wettest month. The temperatures are highest on average in January, at around 19.7 °C (67.5 °F), and lowest in July, at around 13.0 °C (55.4 °F). The highest temperature ever recorded in Salazie was 30.2 °C (86.4 °F) on 16 January 2000; the coldest temperature ever recorded was 2.6 °C (36.7 °F) on 19 July 1991.

Climate data for Salazie (Mare A Vieille Place, altitude 870m, 1991–2020 normals, extremes 1989–present)
Month	Jan	Feb	Mar	Apr	May	Jun	Jul	Aug	Sep	Oct	Nov	Dec	Year
Record high °C (°F)	31.5 (88.7)	31.6 (88.9)	30.7 (87.3)	28.6 (83.5)	26.9 (80.4)	26.8 (80.2)	24.2 (75.6)	25.5 (77.9)	25.3 (77.5)	27.8 (82.0)	29.7 (85.5)	31.4 (88.5)	31.6 (88.9)
Mean daily maximum °C (°F)	26.3 (79.3)	26.3 (79.3)	25.8 (78.4)	24.7 (76.5)	22.5 (72.5)	20.5 (68.9)	19.6 (67.3)	20.1 (68.2)	21.2 (70.2)	22.6 (72.7)	24.3 (75.7)	25.7 (78.3)	23.3 (73.9)
Daily mean °C (°F)	22.0 (71.6)	22.2 (72.0)	21.6 (70.9)	20.5 (68.9)	18.4 (65.1)	16.4 (61.5)	15.5 (59.9)	15.7 (60.3)	16.6 (61.9)	17.9 (64.2)	19.4 (66.9)	21.1 (70.0)	18.9 (66.0)
Mean daily minimum °C (°F)	17.7 (63.9)	18.0 (64.4)	17.4 (63.3)	16.2 (61.2)	14.3 (57.7)	12.3 (54.1)	11.4 (52.5)	11.4 (52.5)	11.9 (53.4)	13.2 (55.8)	14.6 (58.3)	16.4 (61.5)	14.6 (58.3)
Record low °C (°F)	13.3 (55.9)	13.5 (56.3)	13.2 (55.8)	11.7 (53.1)	8.5 (47.3)	7.9 (46.2)	7.1 (44.8)	7.5 (45.5)	7.2 (45.0)	7.7 (45.9)	9.2 (48.6)	11.7 (53.1)	7.1 (44.8)
Average precipitation mm (inches)	604.2 (23.79)	697.0 (27.44)	598.8 (23.57)	193.6 (7.62)	160.4 (6.31)	107.5 (4.23)	93.4 (3.68)	103.8 (4.09)	74.1 (2.92)	74.7 (2.94)	99.7 (3.93)	245.0 (9.65)	3,052.2 (120.17)
Average precipitation days (≥ 1.0 mm)	16.0	15.6	15.0	12.8	10.9	9.3	10.8	10.9	8.7	8.1	7.6	11.4	137.2
Source: Météo-France

Climate data for Salazie (Hell-Bourg, altitude 975m, 1991–2020 normals, extremes 1961–2001)
Month	Jan	Feb	Mar	Apr	May	Jun	Jul	Aug	Sep	Oct	Nov	Dec	Year
Record high °C (°F)	30.2 (86.4)	29.8 (85.6)	29.0 (84.2)	29.6 (85.3)	27.2 (81.0)	25.0 (77.0)	24.0 (75.2)	25.0 (77.0)	25.9 (78.6)	27.2 (81.0)	28.3 (82.9)	30.1 (86.2)	30.2 (86.4)
Mean daily maximum °C (°F)	24.7 (76.5)	24.0 (75.2)	23.9 (75.0)	23.1 (73.6)	20.8 (69.4)	19.3 (66.7)	17.9 (64.2)	18.3 (64.9)	19.5 (67.1)	20.7 (69.3)	22.2 (72.0)	23.5 (74.3)	21.5 (70.7)
Daily mean °C (°F)	19.7 (67.5)	19.6 (67.3)	19.0 (66.2)	18.0 (64.4)	15.9 (60.6)	14.1 (57.4)	13.0 (55.4)	13.3 (55.9)	14.0 (57.2)	15.3 (59.5)	16.6 (61.9)	18.3 (64.9)	16.4 (61.5)
Mean daily minimum °C (°F)	14.8 (58.6)	15.1 (59.2)	14.1 (57.4)	12.8 (55.0)	10.9 (51.6)	9.0 (48.2)	8.1 (46.6)	8.3 (46.9)	8.5 (47.3)	9.9 (49.8)	10.9 (51.6)	13.0 (55.4)	11.3 (52.3)
Record low °C (°F)	8.5 (47.3)	9.0 (48.2)	8.4 (47.1)	6.8 (44.2)	4.5 (40.1)	3.9 (39.0)	2.6 (36.7)	3.0 (37.4)	3.7 (38.7)	5.2 (41.4)	5.0 (41.0)	7.4 (45.3)	2.6 (36.7)
Average precipitation mm (inches)	655.1 (25.79)	777.8 (30.62)	615.8 (24.24)	209.6 (8.25)	163.6 (6.44)	107.7 (4.24)	102.6 (4.04)	110.9 (4.37)	92.8 (3.65)	93.5 (3.68)	119.4 (4.70)	283.7 (11.17)	3,332.5 (131.20)
Average precipitation days (≥ 1.0 mm)	18.9	18.5	17.9	15.4	13.5	11.9	13.0	13.3	11.8	12.6	11.6	15.7	174.0
Source: Météo-France

== Population ==
Historical population
Year	Pop.	±% p.a.
1967	7,105	—
1974	6,462	−1.35%
1982	6,467	+0.01%
1990	7,004	+1.00%
1999	7,402	+0.62%
2007	7,181	−0.38%
2012	7,320	+0.38%
2017	7,312	−0.02%
2023	7,268	−0.10%
Source: INSEE

== Personalities ==
- Anchaing and Héva: reality or legend of a couple of runaway slaves

== Gallery ==
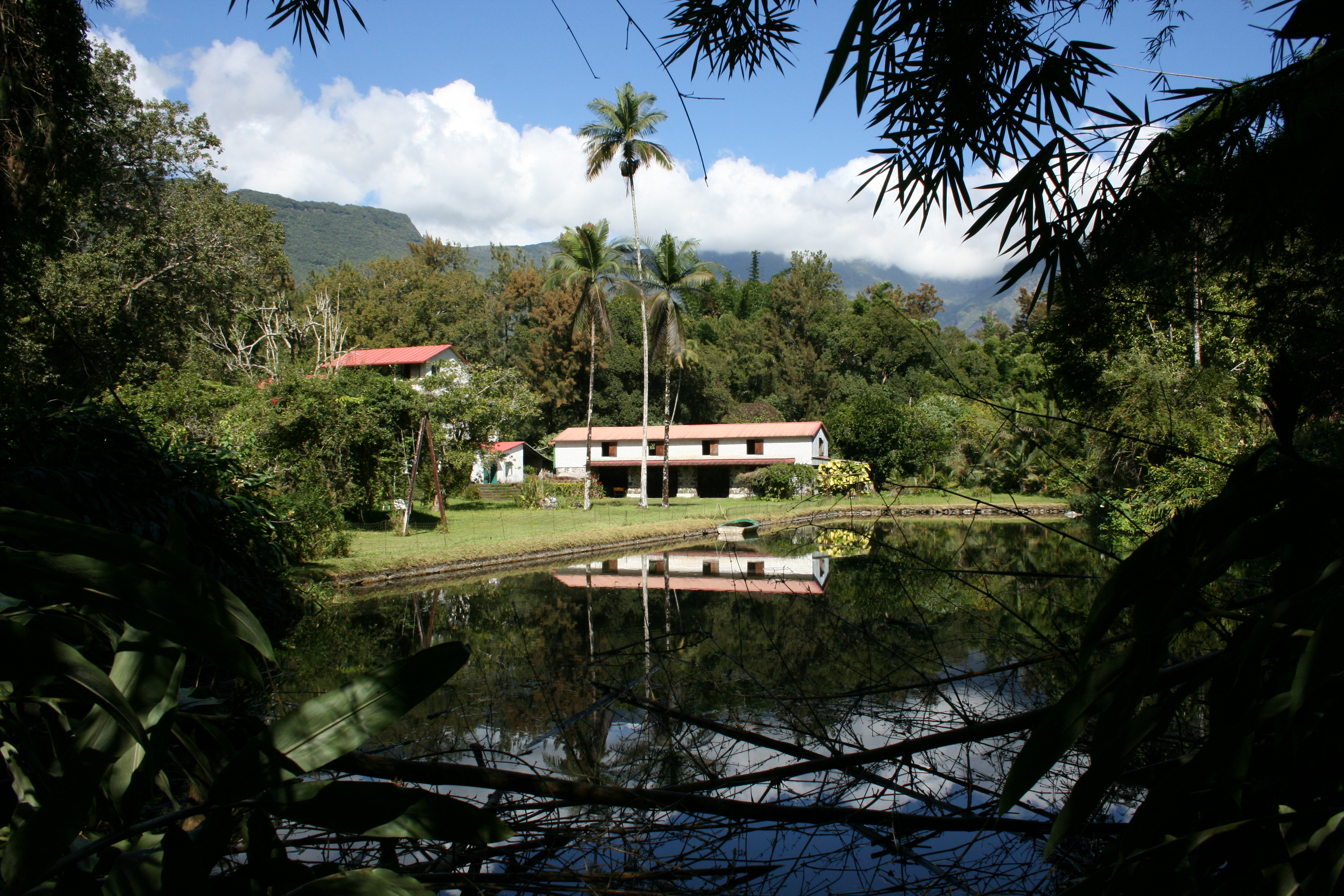
Mare-à-Citrons

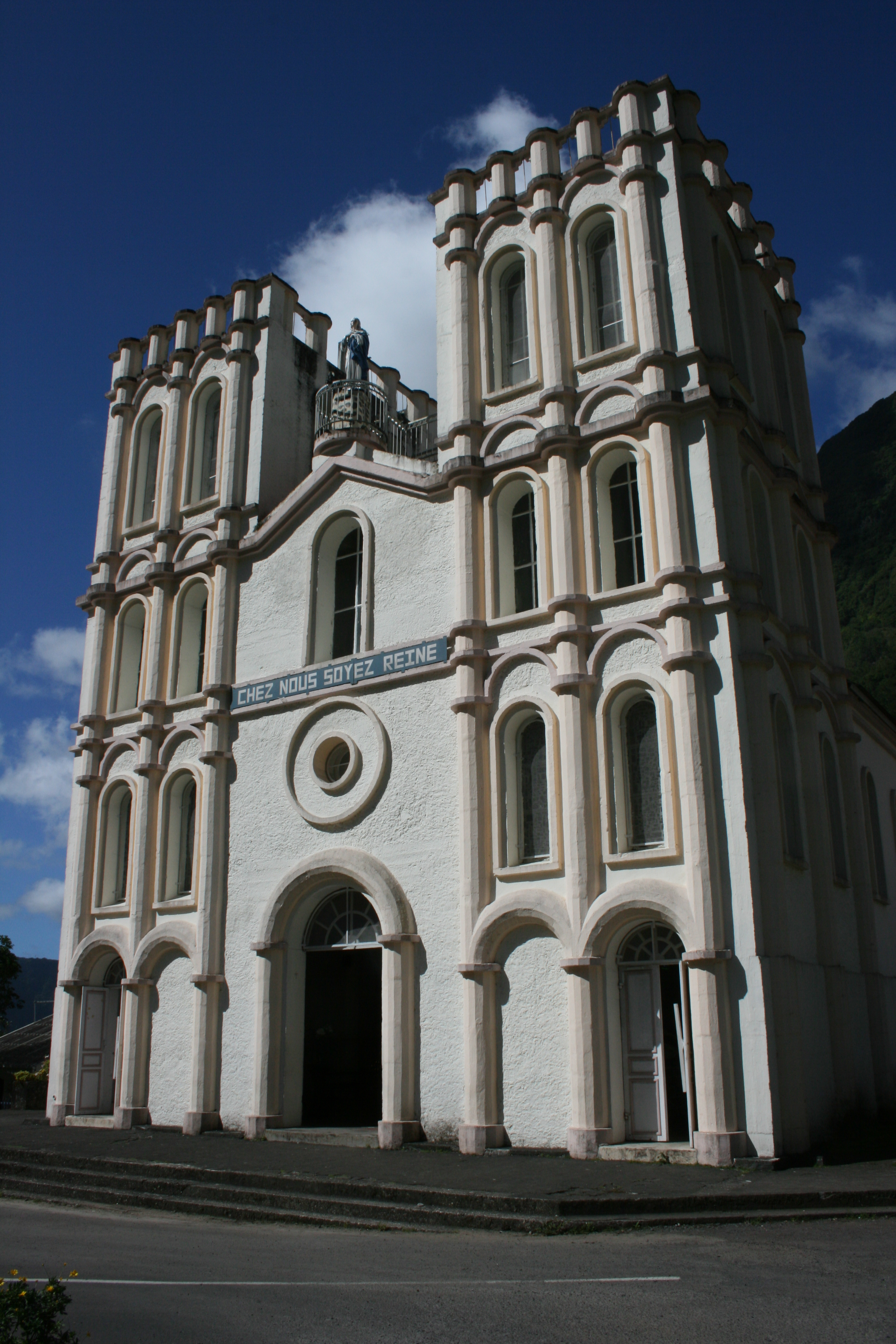
Church of Salazie

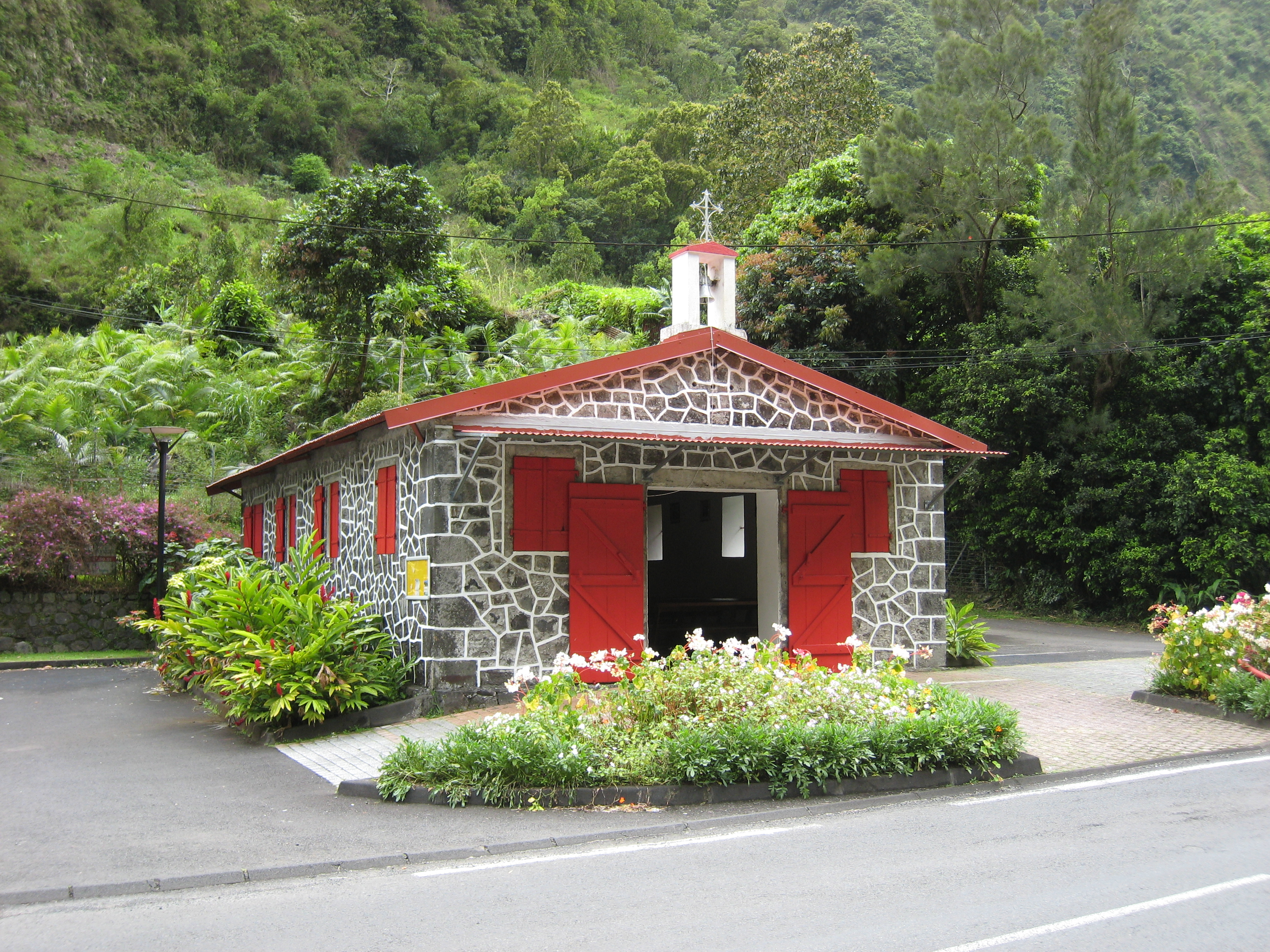

== See also ==
- Hell-Bourg, a village, part of the commune of Salazie
- Trou de Fer
- Communes of the Réunion department
- Bridal Veil Falls
