= Sainte-Suzanne, Réunion =

Sainte-Suzanne
- Commune
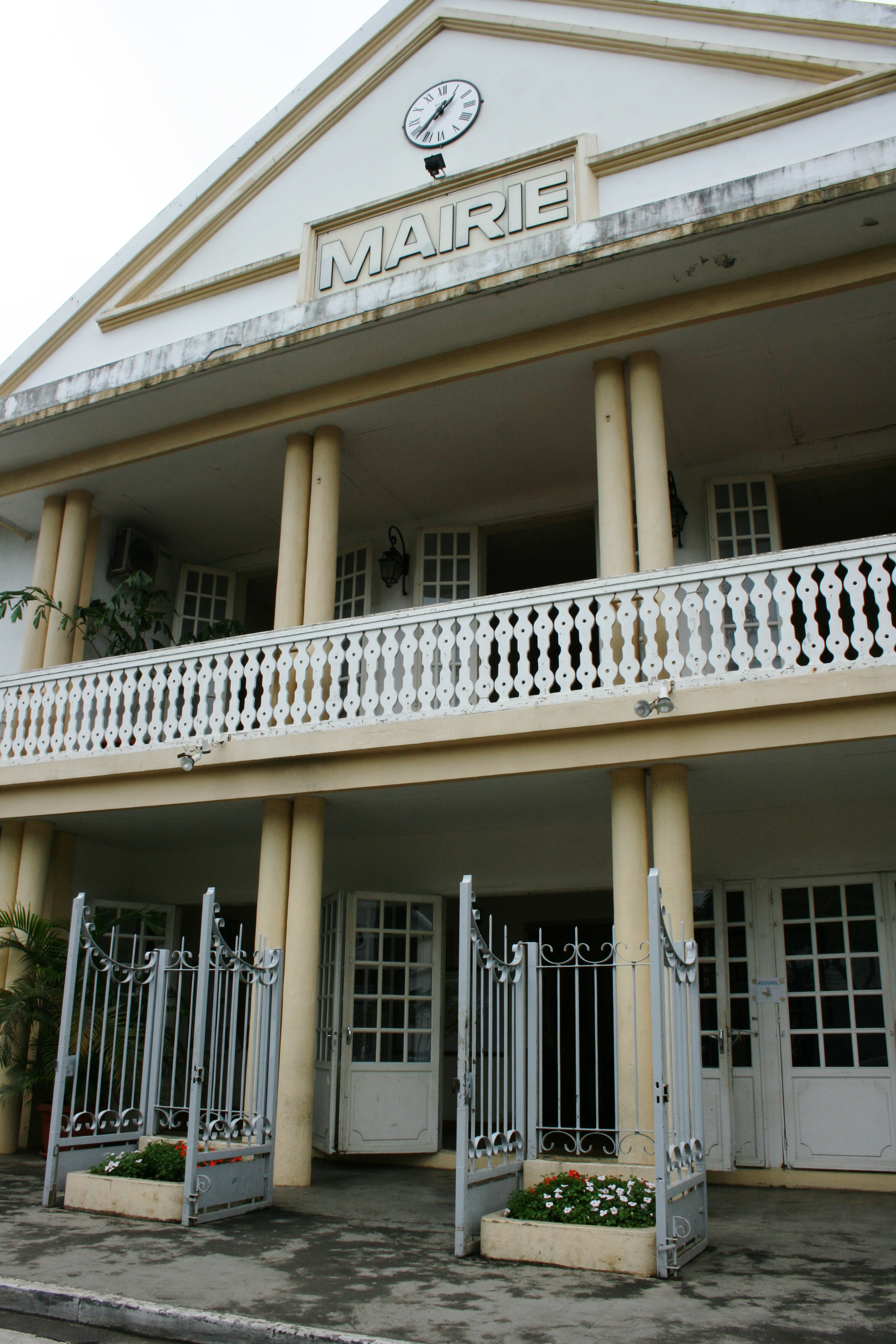
- The Hôtel de Ville

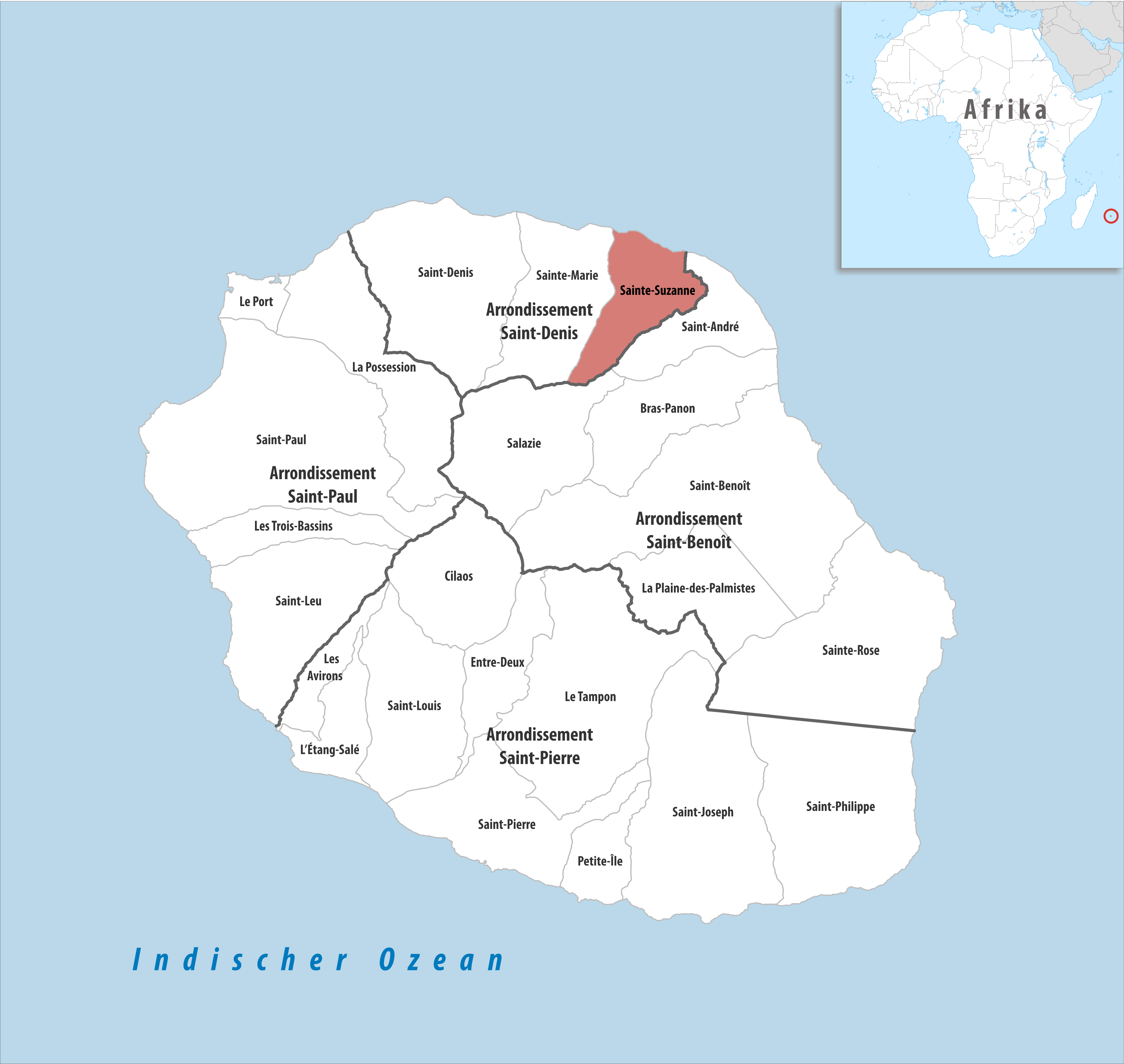
- Location of Sainte-Suzanne
- Coordinates: 20°54′20″S 55°36′26″E
- Country: France
- Overseas region and department: Réunion
- Arrondissement: Saint-Denis
- Canton: Saint-André-1
- Intercommunality: Nord de la Réunion

Government
  - Mayor (2020–2026): Maurice Gironcel
- Area^{1}: 58.84 km^{2} (22.72 sq mi)
- Elevation: 5 m (16 ft)
- Highest elevation: 1,449 m (4,754 ft)
- Lowest elevation: 0 m (0 ft)
- Population (2023): 25,551
  - Density: 434.2/km^{2} (1,125/sq mi)
- Time zone: UTC+04:00
- INSEE/Postal code: 97420 /97441
- ^{1} French Land Register data, which excludes lakes, ponds, glaciers > 1 km^{2} (0.386 sq mi or 247 acres) and river estuaries.

Sainte-Suzanne (French pronunciation: [sɛ̃t syzan]) is a commune on the north coast of the French island and department of Réunion, an island located approximately 950 km (590 mi) east of the island of Madagascar.

== Geography ==
Sainte-Suzanne is bordered by the communes of Saint-André, Sainte-Marie and Salazie. The course of the Saint-Jean River denoted the border between Saint-André and Saint-Suzanne. Quartier-Français is a village in this commune.

=== Climate ===
Sainte-Suzanne has a humid subtropical climate (Köppen climate classification Cfa) closely bordering on a tropical rainforest climate (Af). The average annual temperature in Sainte-Suzanne is 20.3 °C (68.5 °F). The average annual rainfall is 4,385.9 mm (172.67 in) with January as the wettest month. The temperatures are highest on average in February, at around 23.2 °C (73.8 °F), and lowest in August, at around 17.5 °C (63.5 °F). The highest temperature ever recorded in Sainte-Suzanne was 32.3 °C (90.1 °F) on 7 March 2018; the coldest temperature ever recorded was 8.0 °C (46.4 °F) on 2 July 2005.

Climate data for Sainte-Suzanne (1991−2020 normals, extremes 2002−present)
Month	Jan	Feb	Mar	Apr	May	Jun	Jul	Aug	Sep	Oct	Nov	Dec	Year
Record high °C (°F)	30.0 (86.0)	30.8 (87.4)	32.3 (90.1)	29.9 (85.8)	28.9 (84.0)	27.1 (80.8)	27.0 (80.6)	25.6 (78.1)	26.1 (79.0)	27.4 (81.3)	28.7 (83.7)	30.6 (87.1)	32.3 (90.1)
Mean daily maximum °C (°F)	26.5 (79.7)	26.8 (80.2)	26.3 (79.3)	25.5 (77.9)	23.7 (74.7)	22.2 (72.0)	21.3 (70.3)	21.4 (70.5)	22.0 (71.6)	23.0 (73.4)	24.4 (75.9)	25.8 (78.4)	24.1 (75.4)
Daily mean °C (°F)	22.9 (73.2)	23.2 (73.8)	22.8 (73.0)	21.8 (71.2)	20.0 (68.0)	18.4 (65.1)	17.6 (63.7)	17.5 (63.5)	18.1 (64.6)	19.1 (66.4)	20.4 (68.7)	22.0 (71.6)	20.3 (68.5)
Mean daily minimum °C (°F)	19.4 (66.9)	19.7 (67.5)	19.3 (66.7)	18.2 (64.8)	16.3 (61.3)	14.6 (58.3)	13.8 (56.8)	13.6 (56.5)	14.2 (57.6)	15.3 (59.5)	16.4 (61.5)	18.1 (64.6)	16.6 (61.9)
Record low °C (°F)	14.8 (58.6)	15.8 (60.4)	15.0 (59.0)	13.4 (56.1)	9.9 (49.8)	9.7 (49.5)	8.0 (46.4)	8.8 (47.8)	8.7 (47.7)	8.3 (46.9)	10.6 (51.1)	13.4 (56.1)	8.0 (46.4)
Average precipitation mm (inches)	657.4 (25.88)	578.8 (22.79)	653.3 (25.72)	387.5 (15.26)	364.4 (14.35)	273.0 (10.75)	222.2 (8.75)	237.1 (9.33)	217.5 (8.56)	195.9 (7.71)	242.3 (9.54)	356.5 (14.04)	4,385.9 (172.67)
Average precipitation days (≥ 1.0 mm)	22.3	19.7	21.4	18.8	16.4	15.8	16.2	17.2	16.7	16.1	15.4	18.7	214.8
Source: Météo-France

== History ==
The town, along with Saint-Denis, was founded in 1667 by Étienne Regnault, the first governor of the island. The Hôtel de Ville was completed in around 1847.

== Population ==
Historical population
Year	Pop.	±% p.a.
1967	11,151	—
1974	11,984	+1.03%
1982	13,196	+1.21%
1990	14,695	+1.35%
1999	18,144	+2.37%
2007	21,856	+2.35%
2012	22,388	+0.48%
2017	23,505	+0.98%
2023	25,551	+1.40%
Source: INSEE

== Personalities ==
The following people were natives of Sainte-Suzanne:

- Edmond Albius (1829–1880), a slave who discovered the artificial pollination of vanilla.
- Élie Hoarau (born 1938), politician.
- René-Paul Victoria (born 1954), politician.

== See also ==
- Niagara Falls (Réunion)
- Communes of the Réunion department
