= Communauté intercommunale du Nord de La Réunion =

Nord de La Réunion
- Communauté d'agglomération
- Country: France
- Overseas region and department: Réunion{{{region}}}
- No. of communes: {{{nbcomm}}}
- Established: 2000
- Area: 287.8 km^{2} (111.1 sq mi)
- Population (2018): 207,487
  - Density: 720.9/km^{2} (1,867/sq mi)

Communauté intercommunale du Nord de La Réunion is the communauté d'agglomération, an intercommunal structure, centred on the city of Saint-Denis. It is located in Réunion, an overseas department of France. It was created in December 2000. Its area is 287.8 km^{2}. Its population was 207,487 in 2014, of which 150,535 in Saint-Denis proper.

== Composition ==
The communauté d'agglomération consists of the following 3 communes:

1. Saint-Denis
2. Sainte-Marie
3. Sainte-Suzanne
