= Communauté intercommunale Réunion Est =

Réunion Est
- Communauté d'agglomération
- Interactive map of Réunion Est
- Country: France
- Overseas region and department: Réunion{{{region}}}
- No. of communes: {{{nbcomm}}}
- Established: 2001
- Area: 735.8 km^{2} (284.1 sq mi)
- Population (2017): 127,133
  - Density: 172.8/km^{2} (447.5/sq mi)
- Website: www.cirest.fr

The Communauté intercommunale Réunion Est (CIREST) is a communauté d'agglomération, an intercommunal structure in the Réunion overseas department and region of France. It was created in December 2001. Its seat is in Saint-Benoît. Its area is 735.8 km^{2}. Its population was 127,133 in 2017.

== Composition ==
The communauté d'agglomération consists of the following 6 communes:

1. Bras-Panon
2. La Plaine-des-Palmistes
3. Saint-André
4. Saint-Benoît
5. Sainte-Rose
6. Salazie
