= Hôtel de Ville, Saint-André, Réunion =

Town hall in Saint-André, Réunion, France

Hôtel de Ville
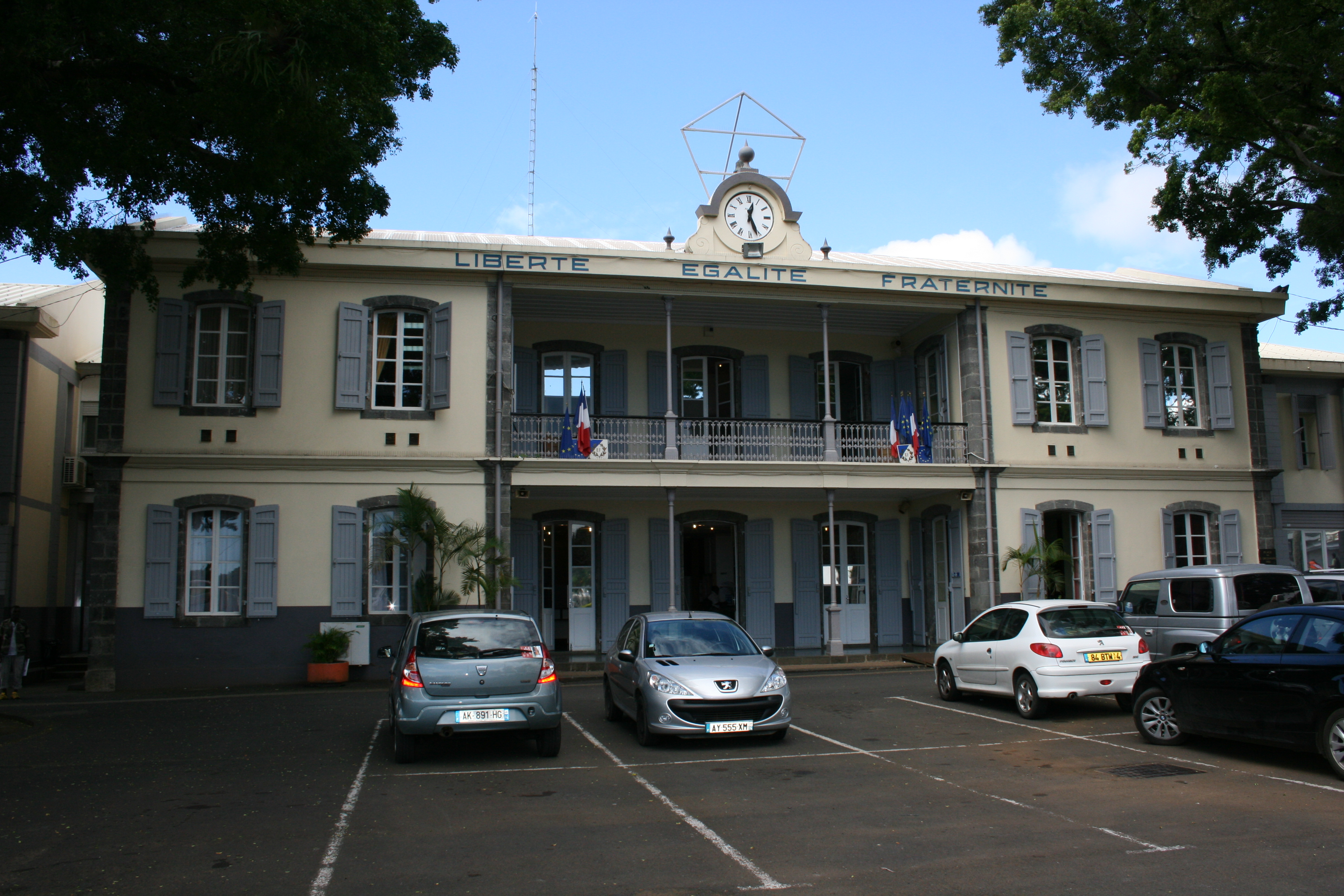
- The main frontage of the Hôtel de Ville in May 2011
- Interactive map of the Hôtel de Ville area

General information
- Type: City hall
- Architectural style: Neoclassical style
- Location: Saint-André, Réunion, France
- Coordinates: 20.9604°S 55.6505°E
- Completed: 1897

Design and construction
- Architect: Auguste-Joseph-Elie Bertin

The Hôtel de Ville (French pronunciation: [otɛl də vil], City Hall) is a municipal building in Saint-André, Réunion, in the Indian Ocean, standing on Place du 2 Décembre.

== History ==
Following the abolition of slavery in Réunion in 1848, there was a large influx of indentured workers from South India known as the Malbars. In the context of this large increase in population, the town council led by the mayor, Raoul Nativel, decided to commission a dedicated town hall. The site they selected was on the east side of Avenue Île-de-France and, unusually for town halls on the island, nearly 5 kilometres (3.1 mi) inland from the sea. The building was designed by Auguste-Joseph-Elie Bertin in the neoclassical style, built in brick with a cement render finish and was officially opened in 1897.

The layout involved a central block with pavilions at each end connected by bridges at first floor level. The design of the central block involved a symmetrical main frontage of seven bays facing onto Avenue Île-de-France. The three central bays contained segmental headed doorways, which were recessed under a canopy supported by iron poles: on the first floor, there were three more segmental headed doorways, which were also recessed in a similar way, creating a balcony. The outer bays were fenestrated by segmental headed windows with shutters on both floors and, at roof level, there was an entablature. Above the central bay, there was a clock supported by scrolls and surmounted by a finial. Internally, the principal room was the Salle du Conseil (council chamber).

A limestone war memorial, intended to commemorate the lives of local people who died in the First World War was designed by the architect, Jean Delune, and unveiled in front of the town hall on 14 September 1938. It incorporated a bronze relief, depicting a dead soldier in the hands of the goddess of victory, which was created by the sculptor, Maxime Real del Sarte. It was moved to the west side of Avenue Île-de-France, but still facing the town hall, in 1983.

In the first half of 2022, the area in front of the town hall was renovated with improved paving and landscaping.
