= Hell-Bourg =

Human settlement

Coordinates: 21.065829°S 55.519457°E

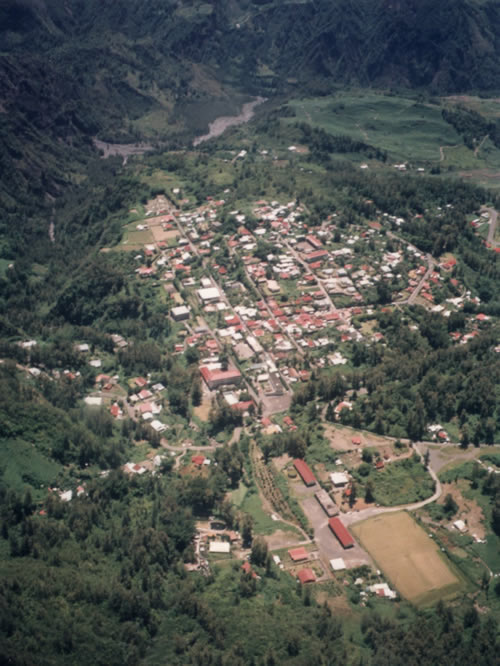
Aerial view of Hell-Bourg.

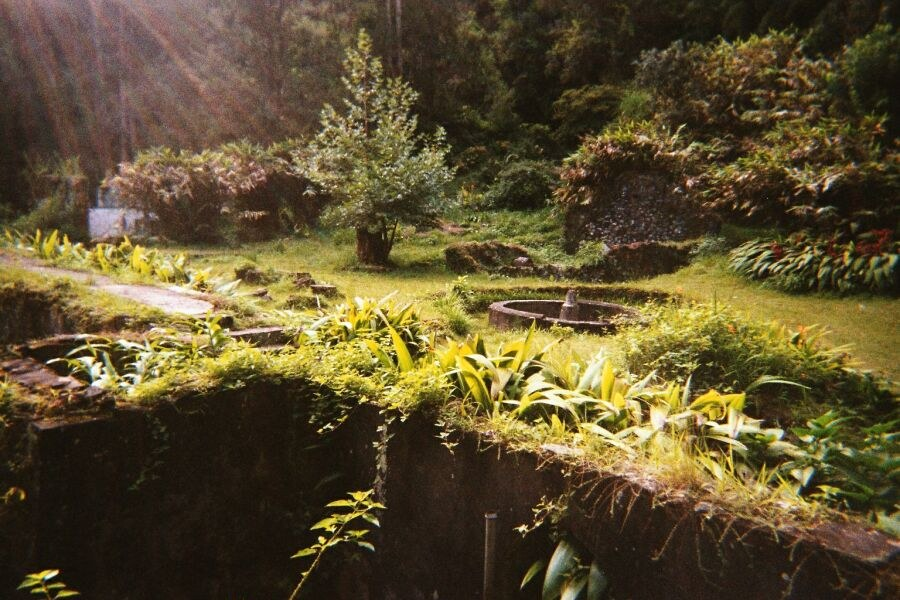
The ruins of the old spa.

Hell-Bourg is a small village in the Salazie commune (administrative division) of the French overseas department of Réunion. It is the main community in the island's Cirque de Salazie, and is named for the former admiral and island governor Anne Chrétien Louis de Hell. Previously the village had been named Bémaho. It is located 1344 m (4412 ft) above sea level.

== History ==
=== Spa town ===
Originally Bémaho/Hell-Bourg was founded as a small but prosperous spa town, and prospered as such for most of a century after the 1830 European discovery of a hot spring near the future village. Contrary to many accounts of the time, this spring had obviously been known to both slaves and other locals for some time, and one colonial administrator remarked that it would be difficult to transform the area into an official bona-fide spa if slaves afflicted with leprosy and ulcers were using it. However, the eventual transformation was not to be stopped, especially after construction of a hotel was ordered by colonial authorities in 1839, and a military hospital associated with the spring finished in 1857. A carriage road finally reached the village in 1890.

The spring had been discovered in the bed of the brook Bras Sec ('Dry arm'), a tributary of the Rivière du Mat. It had a flow of around 800-1,300 litres per hour, and a water temperature of 32°C, and its waters were iron-bearing, only mildly chlorinated and calcic and contained no sulphates. They were soon being recommended for children, weak and anaemic adults, as well as people suffering from gastritis. In 1852, the Société Anonyme de l'Etablissement Thermal de Salazie was founded, which built the spa, a casino and a director's house. Many creole-style villas of rich individuals followed.

The thermal baths were soon famous even beyond Réunion - together with other spas at Cilaos, in the island's south, and Antsirabe at Madagascar, they became a goal of travellers from as far as South Africa, Kenya or Mozambique, as well as a vacation spot for rich vanilla plantation owners from the island's east. The popularity was partly due to spas being marketed widely as a cure to many of the health problems and diseases that afflicted Europeans in the colonial tropics.

=== Decline ===
Later, the springs were purchased by the municipality of Salazie, which in turn ceded them to the Colonial administration. However, in 1920 the water temperature dropped and boiling was required to heat it to the accustomated state which in turn destroyed some of the chemical elements. The spa started to lose its attraction. An attempt to clear the springs with dynamite failed disastrously and caused a partial collapse of the spa and the destruction of the casino.

In late September 1942, the Vichy authorities on Réunion relocated from Saint-Denis to Hell-Bourg, fearing a potential Allied invasion. The spring was finally fully blocked by a cyclone-related landslide in 1948 (as were, temporarily, the roads leading to Hell-Bourg) and the village quickly lost the importance which had originally caused it to flourish in the difficult mountainous region.

=== Modern days ===
After some decades of being mostly forgotten and occupied mainly by poorer farmers, tourism has since given the village a modest income. With a partial contribution to the costs from the European Union, some 26 of the traditional Creole villas were restored. Since 1999 it has been the only village on the island to be a member of Les Plus Beaux Villages de France ('The most beautiful villages in France'), an award given to about 150 of the most striking small communities in France. In connection with the requirements for the award, there are few to no visible modern elements like telephone or power poles in the village.

The village, with its several small and midsized hotels, which include a small youth hostel, is a base for hiking within the Cirque, especially to the small peak in the caldera center, the Piton d'Anchaing (4–6 hours return) or up to the island's central peak, the Piton des Neiges (2 days return). It is also home to a small museum, several nineteenth century Creole buildings, and a famously colorful local cemetery. The area is also known for growing chou chou.
