= Quartier-Français =

Village in Réunion

Coordinates: 20°55′57″S 55°38′18″E

Quartier-Français is a village on the island of Réunion. The village is located on the island's northeastern coast in the commune of Sainte-Suzanne.
