= Étang de Bois Rouge =

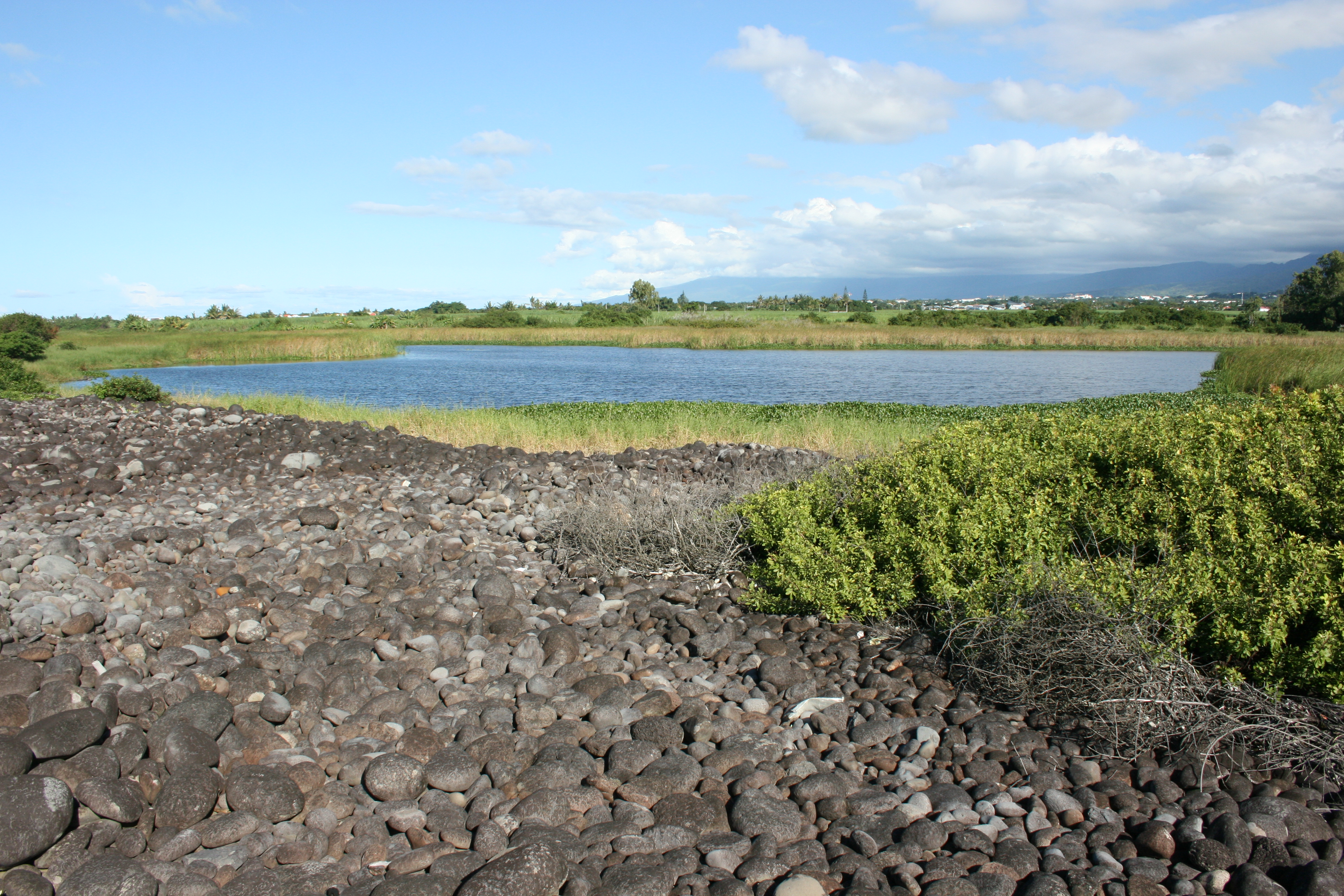
- View on the Lake of Bois Rouge

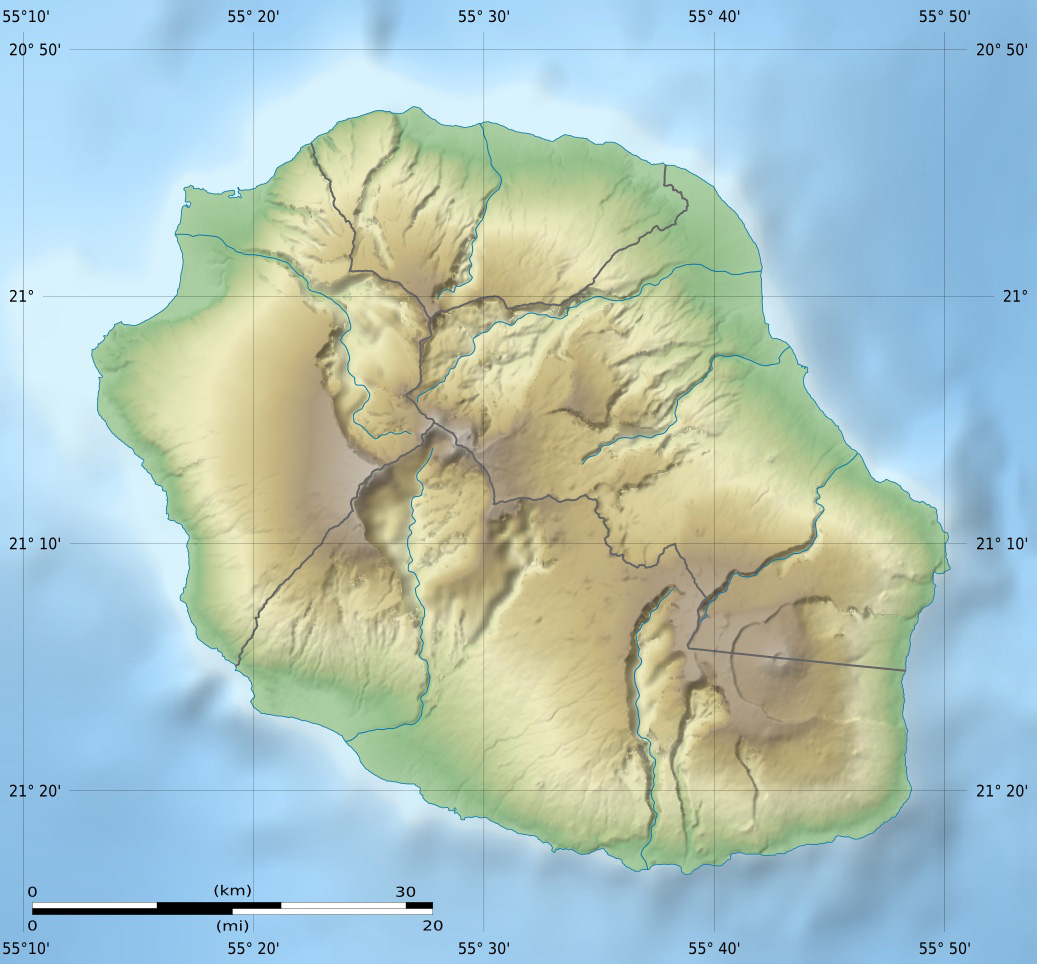
- Location within Réunion
- Location: Réunion
- Coordinates: 20°55′03″S 55°38′57″E
- Type: lagoon
- Basin countries: France (Reunion)
- Max. length: 1.25 km (0.78 mi)
- Max. width: 0.45 km (0.28 mi)
- Surface area: 0.05 km^{2} (0.019 sq mi)
- Surface elevation: 1 m (3 ft 3 in)
- Islands: 1

Étang de Bois Rouge is a coastal wetland in the commune of Saint-André, Réunion, an overseas department and region of France. It is one of the three principal coastal wetland complexes of Réunion.
