= Niagara Fall (Réunion) =

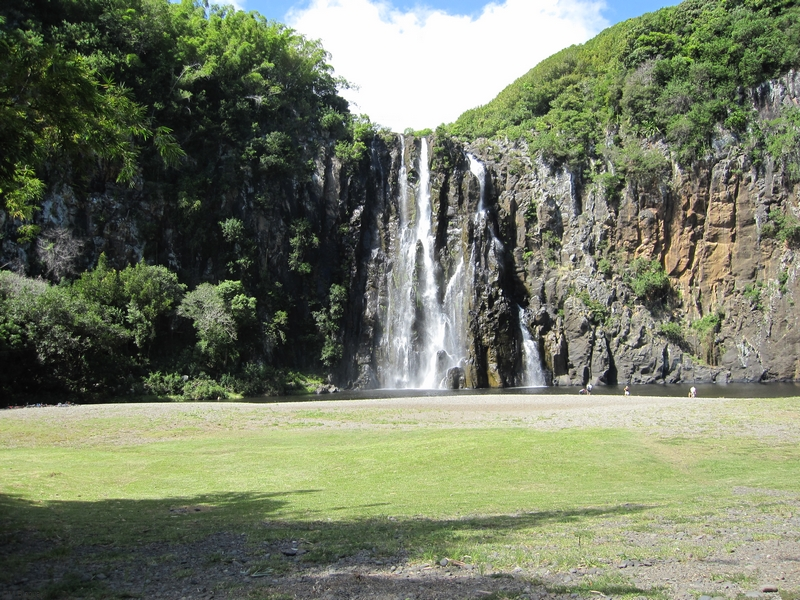
- Niagara Falls on Réunion

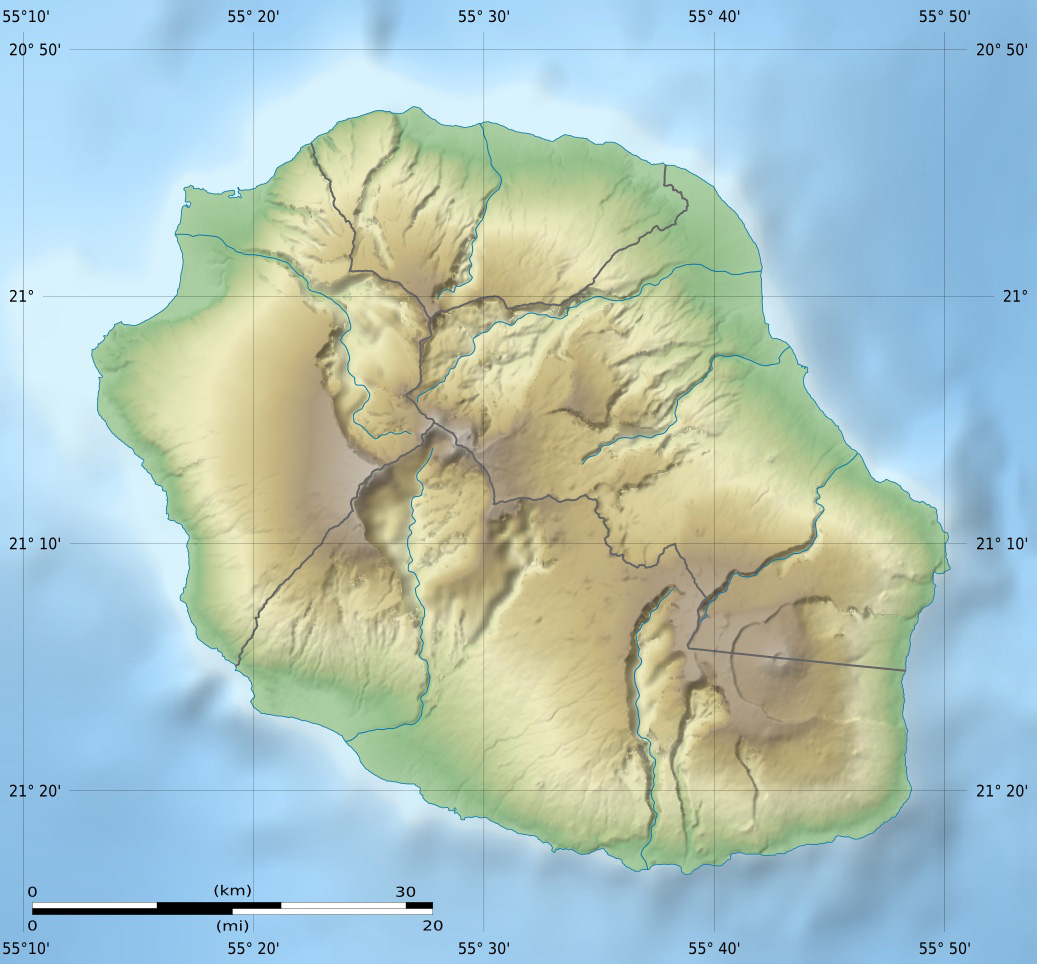
- Location within Réunion
- Location: Sainte-Suzanne, Réunion
- Coordinates: 20°55′15″S 55°36′14″E
- Total height: 25 m (82 ft)
- Watercourse: Sainte-Suzanne river

Niagara Fall is a waterfall in the commune of Sainte-Suzanne on the island of Réunion. Its height is approximately 25 metres (82 ft).

It is of easy access by car, and its pool is a popular picnic place on weekends and holidays.
