= Saint-André, Réunion =

Commune in Réunion, France

Saint-André
- Commune
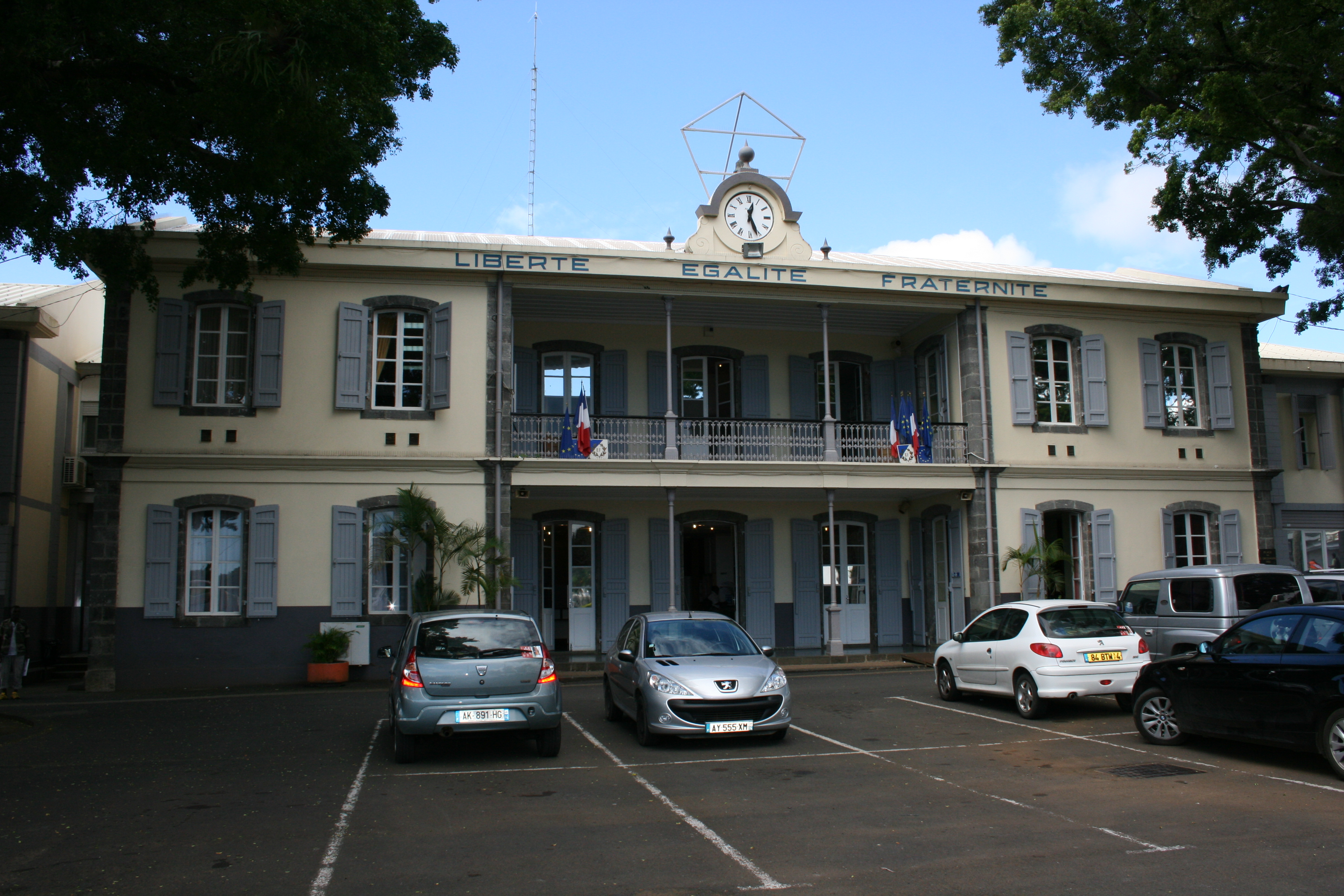
- The Hôtel de Ville

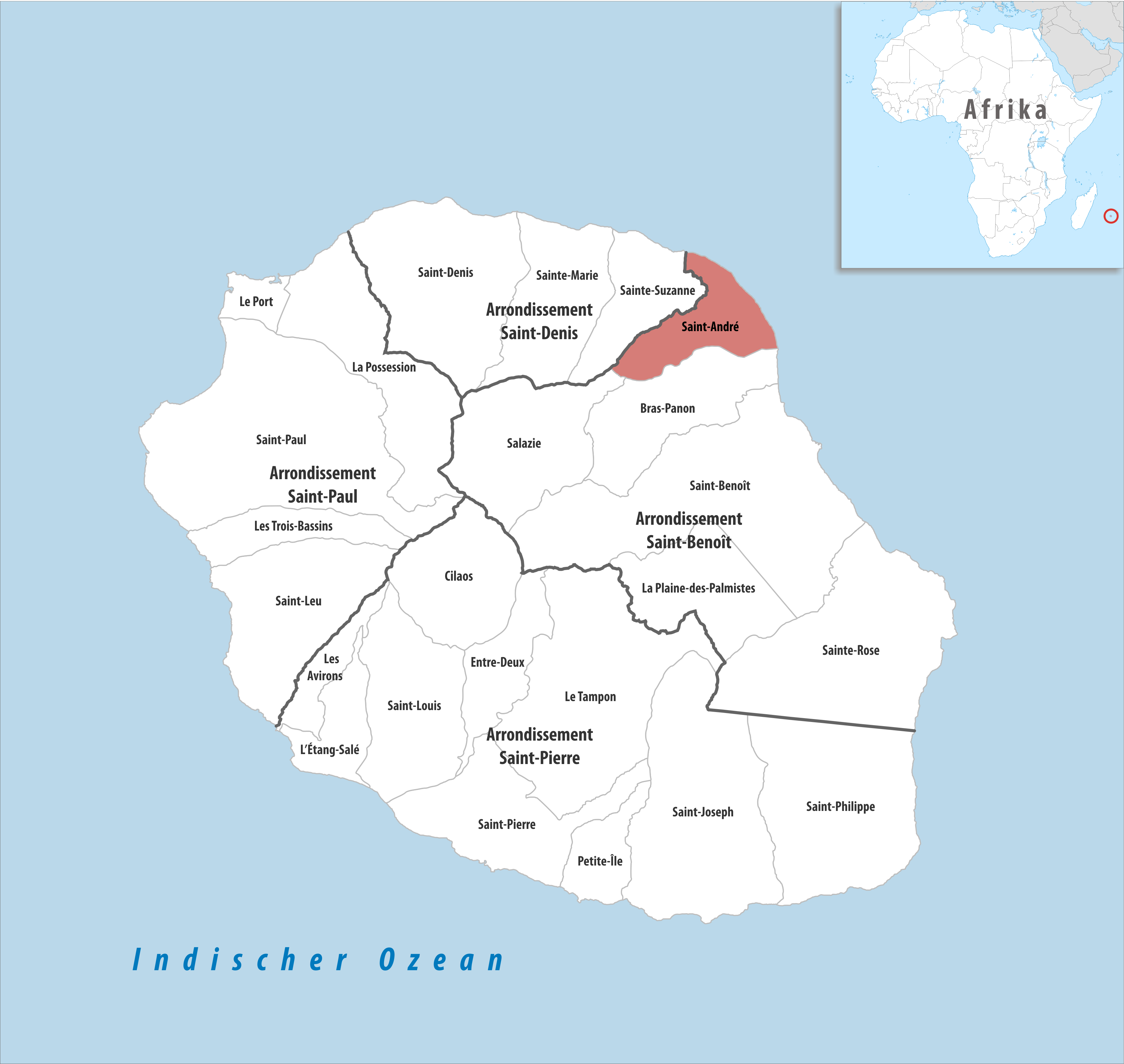
- Location of Saint-André
- Coordinates: 20°57′38″S 55°39′02″E
- Country: France
- Overseas region and department: Réunion
- Arrondissement: Saint-Benoît
- Canton: Saint-André-1, 2 and 3
- Intercommunality: Réunion Est

Government
  - Mayor (2020–2026): Joé Bedier
- Area^{1}: 53.07 km^{2} (20.49 sq mi)
- Elevation: 90 m (300 ft)
- Highest elevation: 920 m (3,020 ft)
- Lowest elevation: 0 m (0 ft)
- Population (2023): 58,885
  - Density: 1,110/km^{2} (2,874/sq mi)
- Time zone: UTC+04:00
- INSEE/Postal code: 97409 /97440
- ^{1} French Land Register data, which excludes lakes, ponds, glaciers > 1 km^{2} (0.386 sq mi or 247 acres) and river estuaries.

Saint-André (French pronunciation: [sɛ̃ ɑ̃dʁe, sɛ̃t‿ɑ̃dʁe]) is the fifth-largest commune in the French overseas department of Réunion. It is located on the northeast part of the island of Réunion. The small lake Étang de Bois Rouge is located in the commune.

This area between the Saint-Jean and the Mât rivers has been populated since the middle of the 17th century. Indeed, the first exiles were confined to Bourbon in 1646 by Mr. Promis, governor of the French Comptoir of Fort-Dauphin, to curb their mutinous ardor. Disembarked from the Saint-Laurent, they were settled in the Quartier des Français, on the banks of the Saint-Jean River. The region of Saint-André has historically seen the landing of the first French.

== Geography ==
=== Climate ===
Saint-André has a tropical rainforest climate (Köppen climate classification Af). The average annual temperature in Saint-André is 24.6 °C (76.3 °F). The average annual rainfall is 2,503.8 mm (98.57 in) with March as the wettest month. The temperatures are highest on average in February, at around 27.4 °C (81.3 °F), and lowest in July, at around 21.8 °C (71.2 °F). The highest temperature ever recorded in Saint-André was 34.0 °C (93.2 °F) on 18 March 2019; the coldest temperature ever recorded was 13.3 °C (55.9 °F) on 3 July 2005.

Climate data for Saint-André (1991−2020 normals, extremes 2004−present)
| Month | Jan | Feb | Mar | Apr | May | Jun | Jul | Aug | Sep | Oct | Nov | Dec | Year |
|---|---|---|---|---|---|---|---|---|---|---|---|---|---|
| Record high °C (°F) | 33.3 (91.9) | 33.5 (92.3) | 34.0 (93.2) | 32.5 (90.5) | 31.2 (88.2) | 29.6 (85.3) | 30.3 (86.5) | 28.2 (82.8) | 28.9 (84.0) | 30.1 (86.2) | 32.0 (89.6) | 33.3 (91.9) | 34.0 (93.2) |
| Mean daily maximum °C (°F) | 30.9 (87.6) | 31.0 (87.8) | 30.6 (87.1) | 29.8 (85.6) | 28.2 (82.8) | 26.5 (79.7) | 25.3 (77.5) | 25.5 (77.9) | 26.2 (79.2) | 27.4 (81.3) | 28.9 (84.0) | 30.4 (86.7) | 28.4 (83.1) |
| Daily mean °C (°F) | 27.1 (80.8) | 27.4 (81.3) | 26.9 (80.4) | 26.0 (78.8) | 24.3 (75.7) | 22.8 (73.0) | 21.8 (71.2) | 21.8 (71.2) | 22.4 (72.3) | 23.7 (74.7) | 25.0 (77.0) | 26.5 (79.7) | 24.6 (76.3) |
| Mean daily minimum °C (°F) | 23.4 (74.1) | 23.7 (74.7) | 23.2 (73.8) | 22.2 (72.0) | 20.5 (68.9) | 19.0 (66.2) | 18.2 (64.8) | 18.1 (64.6) | 18.6 (65.5) | 19.9 (67.8) | 21.1 (70.0) | 22.5 (72.5) | 20.9 (69.6) |
| Record low °C (°F) | 19.2 (66.6) | 19.5 (67.1) | 19.3 (66.7) | 18.4 (65.1) | 16.1 (61.0) | 14.3 (57.7) | 13.3 (55.9) | 14.1 (57.4) | 14.6 (58.3) | 13.4 (56.1) | 16.2 (61.2) | 18.1 (64.6) | 13.3 (55.9) |
| Average precipitation mm (inches) | 373.1 (14.69) | 376.0 (14.80) | 400.7 (15.78) | 259.1 (10.20) | 193.0 (7.60) | 135.3 (5.33) | 129.5 (5.10) | 108.8 (4.28) | 92.2 (3.63) | 85.6 (3.37) | 115.6 (4.55) | 234.9 (9.25) | 2,503.8 (98.57) |
| Average precipitation days (≥ 1.0 mm) | 19.1 | 17.0 | 19.0 | 16.7 | 15.6 | 14.2 | 14.7 | 14.3 | 13.2 | 12.4 | 11.2 | 14.7 | 182.0 |
Source: Météo-France

Climate data for Saint-André (Menciol, altitude 181m, 1991–2020 normals, extremes 1961–present)
| Month | Jan | Feb | Mar | Apr | May | Jun | Jul | Aug | Sep | Oct | Nov | Dec | Year |
|---|---|---|---|---|---|---|---|---|---|---|---|---|---|
| Record high °C (°F) | 32.8 (91.0) | 33.4 (92.1) | 32.4 (90.3) | 32.0 (89.6) | 30.8 (87.4) | 29.4 (84.9) | 30.2 (86.4) | 28.0 (82.4) | 28.7 (83.7) | 29.6 (85.3) | 31.3 (88.3) | 32.5 (90.5) | 33.4 (92.1) |
| Mean daily maximum °C (°F) | 29.3 (84.7) | 29.6 (85.3) | 29.1 (84.4) | 28.3 (82.9) | 26.6 (79.9) | 25.0 (77.0) | 24.1 (75.4) | 24.1 (75.4) | 24.8 (76.6) | 25.7 (78.3) | 27.1 (80.8) | 28.6 (83.5) | 26.9 (80.4) |
| Daily mean °C (°F) | 25.6 (78.1) | 25.8 (78.4) | 25.4 (77.7) | 24.4 (75.9) | 22.7 (72.9) | 21.1 (70.0) | 20.3 (68.5) | 20.3 (68.5) | 20.8 (69.4) | 21.9 (71.4) | 23.2 (73.8) | 24.7 (76.5) | 23.0 (73.4) |
| Mean daily minimum °C (°F) | 21.8 (71.2) | 22.0 (71.6) | 21.7 (71.1) | 20.6 (69.1) | 18.9 (66.0) | 17.2 (63.0) | 16.5 (61.7) | 16.5 (61.7) | 16.9 (62.4) | 18.0 (64.4) | 19.2 (66.6) | 20.8 (69.4) | 19.2 (66.6) |
| Record low °C (°F) | 17.8 (64.0) | 16.0 (60.8) | 16.0 (60.8) | 15.0 (59.0) | 13.2 (55.8) | 12.0 (53.6) | 10.4 (50.7) | 11.0 (51.8) | 11.8 (53.2) | 11.2 (52.2) | 13.5 (56.3) | 16.0 (60.8) | 10.4 (50.7) |
| Average precipitation mm (inches) | 482.2 (18.98) | 533.8 (21.02) | 522.5 (20.57) | 327.2 (12.88) | 264.0 (10.39) | 190.0 (7.48) | 176.5 (6.95) | 170.2 (6.70) | 134.6 (5.30) | 128.7 (5.07) | 158.9 (6.26) | 322.3 (12.69) | 3,410.9 (134.29) |
| Average precipitation days (≥ 1.0 mm) | 20.0 | 18.1 | 19.6 | 16.8 | 15.5 | 13.8 | 15.8 | 15.9 | 14.1 | 14.6 | 12.8 | 15.8 | 192.7 |
Source: Météo-France

== History ==
The Hôtel de Ville was completed in 1897.

== Population ==
Historical population
| Year | Pop. | ±% p.a. |
|---|---|---|
| 1961 | 19,255 | — |
| 1967 | 22,094 | +2.32% |
| 1974 | 25,231 | +1.91% |
| 1982 | 30,075 | +2.22% |
| 1990 | 35,049 | +1.93% |
| 1999 | 43,174 | +2.34% |
| 2007 | 51,964 | +2.34% |
| 2012 | 54,721 | +1.04% |
| 2017 | 56,268 | +0.56% |
| 2023 | 58,885 | +0.76% |
Source: SPLAF and INSEE (1967-2023)

== Malaysia Airlines Flight 370 debris ==
On 29 July 2015, airliner marine debris was found on a beach in the commune, later confirmed to be a part of Malaysia Airlines Flight 370 which disappeared about 4,000 km (2,500 mi) east of Réunion on 8 March 2014.

== Education ==
- Epitech

== See also ==
- Communes of the Réunion department
