= Cyclone Hyacinthe =

South-West Indian cyclone in 1980

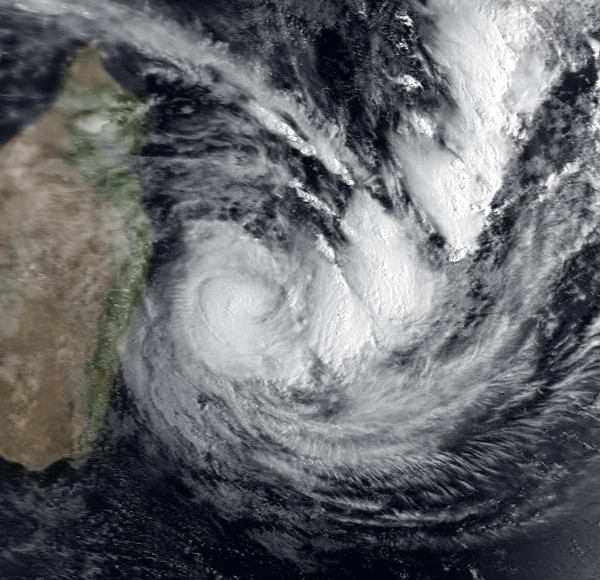
- Cyclone Hyacinthe on January 25

Meteorological history
- Formed: January 15, 1980
- Extratropical: January 29, 1980
- Dissipated: January 31, 1980

Intense tropical cyclone
- 10-minute sustained (MF)
- Highest winds: 165 km/h (105 mph)
- Lowest pressure: 960 hPa (mbar); 28.35 inHg

Category 1-equivalent tropical cyclone
- 1-minute sustained (SSHWS/JTWC)
- Highest winds: 130 km/h (80 mph)

Overall effects
- Fatalities: 25
- Damage: $167 million (1980 USD)
- Areas affected: Mauritius, Réunion, Madagascar
- IBTrACS
- Part of the 1979–80 South-West Indian Ocean cyclone season

Intense Tropical Cyclone Hyacinthe was the wettest tropical cyclone on record worldwide. The eighth named storm of the 1979–80 South-West Indian Ocean cyclone season, Hyacinthe formed on January 15, 1980, to the northeast of Mauritius in the southern Indian Ocean. Initially it moved to the west-southwest, and while slowly intensifying it passed north of the French overseas department of Réunion. On January 19, Météo-France estimated that the storm had intensified to a tropical cyclone. Hyacinthe looped to the south of eastern Madagascar and weakened, although it restrengthened after turning to the east. The storm executed another loop to the southwest of Réunion, passing near the island for a second and later third time. Hyacinthe became extratropical on January 29 after turning southward, dissipating two days later.

For twelve days, Hyacinthe dropped torrential rainfall on Réunion; nearly all of the island received more than 1 m (3.3 ft) of precipitation. Over a 15-day period from January 14 to January 28, 6,083 mm (239.5 in) of rainfall were recorded at Commerson Crater, a volcano caldera. The heaviest rainfall occurred through a process called orographic lift in the mountainous interior, leading to hundreds of landslides. Widespread floods damaged half the roads on Réunion and isolated three villages. Hyacinthe caused heavy damage to crops and damaged or destroyed 2,000 houses. Losses from the storm totaled $167 million (1980 USD, 676 million francs), (Note: All damage totals are reported in 1980 United States dollars with the original French franc total in parentheses.) and 25 people were killed.

== Meteorological history ==
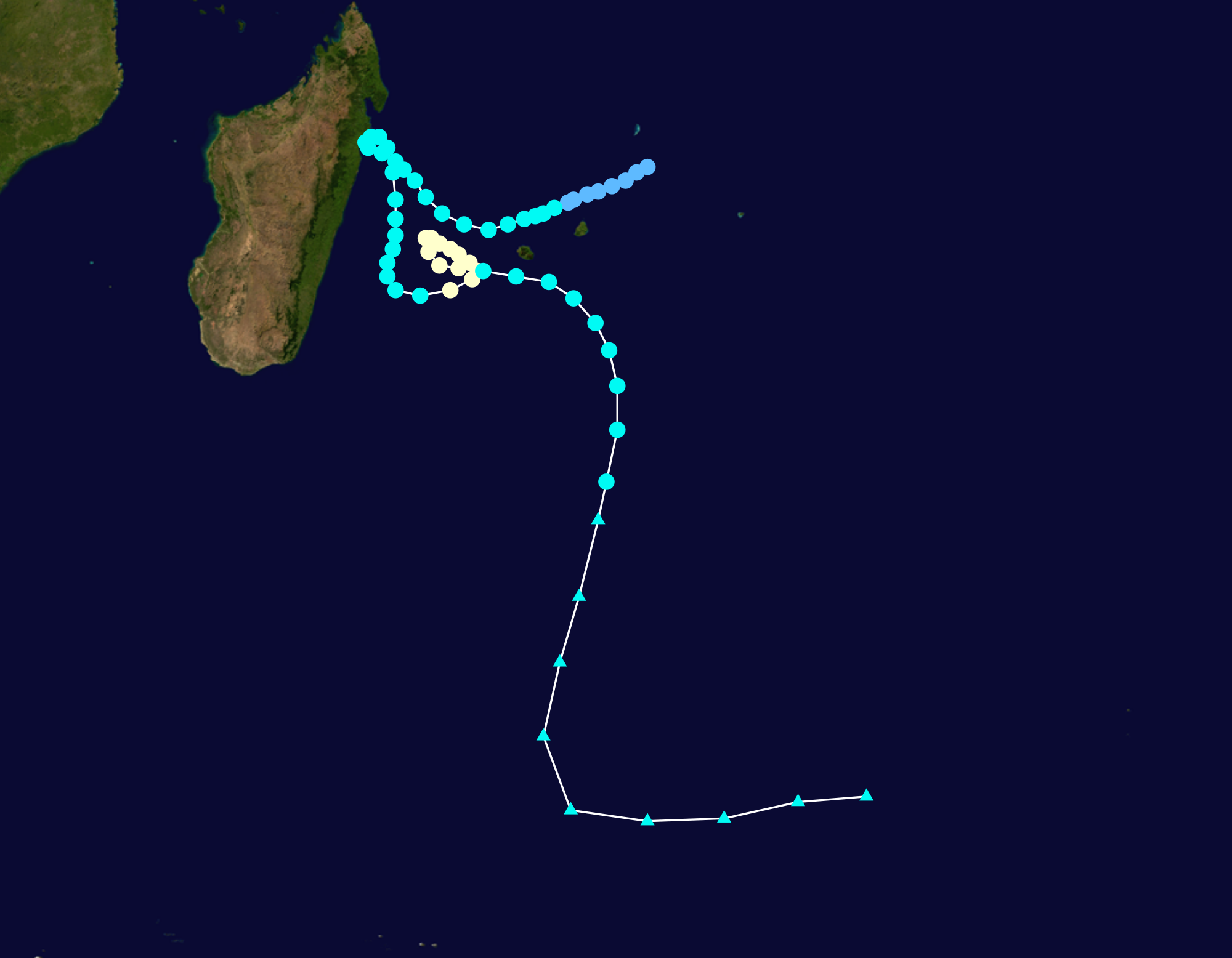
Map plotting the storm's track and intensity, according to the Saffir–Simpson scale Map key Saffir–Simpson scale Tropical depression (≤38 mph, ≤62 km/h) Tropical storm (39–73 mph, 63–118 km/h) Category 1 (74–95 mph, 119–153 km/h) Category 2 (96–110 mph, 154–177 km/h) Category 3 (111–129 mph, 178–208 km/h) Category 4 (130–156 mph, 209–251 km/h) Category 5 (≥157 mph, ≥252 km/h) Unknown Storm type Tropical cyclone Subtropical cyclone Extratropical cyclone, remnant low, tropical disturbance, or monsoon depression

In the middle of January 1980, the Intertropical Convergence Zone persisted along 10° S, spawning a small low-level circulation near St. Brandon. According to Météo-France (MFR), a tropical depression formed about 355 km (221 mi) northeast of Mauritius on January 15. (Note: Météo-France is the official Regional Specialized Meteorological Center for the south-west Indian Ocean, based out of Réunion.) It tracked to the west-southwest, passing north of the island on January 17. That day, the Joint Typhoon Warning Center (JTWC) also reported that a tropical depression had developed, giving it the identifier "08S". Shortly thereafter, the JTWC upgraded the depression to a tropical storm, and the MFR followed suit on January 18, naming the storm Hyacinthe. The storm gradually intensified as it passed north of Réunion, with 1-minute winds of 110 km/h (68 mph) by January 19, according to the JTWC. That day, an eye developed, and MFR estimated that Hyacinthe intensified to tropical cyclone status, with 10-minute winds of 120 km/h (75 mph). A strengthening anticyclone to the south turned the storm northwestward, and on January 20, Hyacinthe executed a small loop to the south, just offshore eastern Madagascar.

While moving to the south, Hyacinthe's winds steadily decreased, as the storm weakened. On January 21, the storm weakened below tropical cyclone intensity, and on January 22 the JTWC estimated winds decreased to 75 km/h (47 mph). The next day, it turned to the east while slowly re-intensifying. On January 24, the JTWC upgraded Hyacinthe to the equivalent of a minimal hurricane, with winds of 120 km/h (75 mph). After approaching within 175 km (109 mi) west-southwest of Réunion, the cyclone turned to the northwest and executed another loop. The JTWC estimated that Hyacinthe reached peak winds of 130 km/h (81 mph) on January 25, which the storm maintained for about 24 hours. During that time, Hyacinthe turned to the southeast and later weakened. On January 26, it moved near Réunion for the third time, passing about 105 km (65 mi) to the south. The storm turned southward, becoming extratropical on January 29. Over the next two days, the remnants of Hyacinthe accelerated, turned to the east, and dissipated to the southeast of Madagascar.

== Impact ==
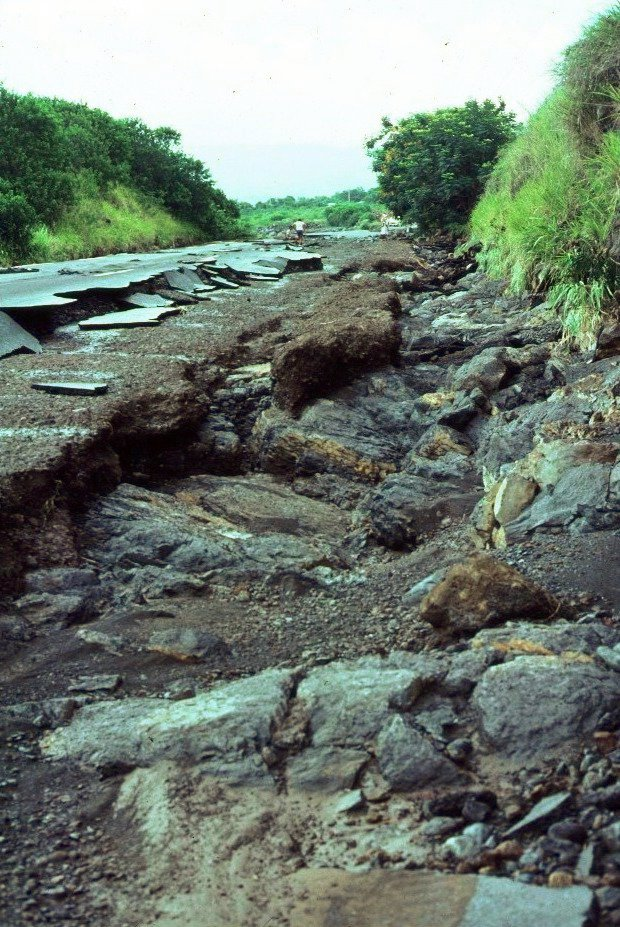
Washed out road in Saint-Pierre, Réunion

For twelve days, the circulation of the storm produced cloudiness and thunderstorms over Réunion. Hyacinthe broke several rainfall records for tropical cyclones, becoming the wettest tropical cyclone on record. From January 14 to January 28, the storm dropped 6,083 mm (239.5 in) at Commerson Crater, just north of the Piton de la Fournaise volcano. Over ten days, Hyacinthe produced 5,678 mm (223.5 in), also at Commerson. In twelve hours, Hyacinthe dropped 1,095 mm (43.1 in) of rainfall at Grand Îlet, just 49 mm (1.9 in) shy of the record set by Cyclone Denise in 1966. The highest daily total was on January 25, when 1,140 mm (45 in) fell at Commerson. Over a three-day period, the storm dropped 3,240 mm (128 in) at Commerson, as well as 4,300 mm (170 in) over a five-day period ending on January 28. Only a small portion of the island near Saint-Pierre received less than 1 m (3.3 ft) of rainfall, and totals increased further inland, with over 2 m (6.6 ft) recorded at four locations. Such heavy rainfall typically occurs on the island when tropical cyclones approach, owing to orographic enhancement in the mountainous interior.

In addition to the rainfall, Hyacinthe produced a minimum barometric pressure of 977.8 mbar (28.87 inHg) at Saint-Pierre on January 27. Wind gusts reached 150 km/h (93 mph) in Saint-Denis, although the mountainous portion of the island reported winds as strong as 180 km/h (110 mph). Wave action was not severe due to the quick changes in track and lack of significant intensity. There was some beach erosion along western-facing beaches, and Pointe des Galets sustained damage to coastal properties. However, any major damage caused by the storm was largely due to the heavy rainfall. The Rivière Langevin reported increased flow, reaching a discharge of about 300 m^{3}/s (10,500 ft^{3}/s). Along Rivière-du-Mat les Bas, river flooding entered five houses. Floods washed out a 30 m (98 ft) and a 60 m (200 ft) portion of a highway along a ravine near Chaudron. Along Route nationale 1, traffic was disrupted after rocks blocked the roadway. In Petite-Île, floods washed out a bridge and 200 m (660 ft) of roads. About half of the roads on Réunion were damaged, and road damage was estimated at $40 million (1980 USD, 161.3 million francs). The rain caused widespread mudslides, including hundreds near Salazie and Cilaos. Three towns were temporarily isolated, including Hell-Bourg which was cut off for about eight days, Helicopters delivered food and clothing to the villages.

Throughout Réunion, Hyacinthe killed 25 people and left 7,000 homeless. Four of the deaths occurred after a house was washed away at Petite-Île. A school was destroyed in Saint-Louis. The storm caused power and water outages, and about 30% of the island temporarily lost phone service. Hyacinthe damaged 1,712 houses and destroyed another 288; housing damage totaled about $42 million (1980 USD, 170 million francs). Flooding caused $48 million (1980 USD, 194 million francs) in agricultural damage, including about 1,000 killed cattle and near-total losses to bananas, mangoes, and avocados. Overall damage was estimated at $167 million (676 million francs). Many records set by the storm were broken by Cyclone Gamede in 2007, including the rainfall accumulations from three to eight days. However, Hyacinthe retained its status as the wettest overall tropical cyclone.

Elsewhere, Hyacinthe affected Madagascar as a weaker storm. Wind gusts reached 126 km/h (78 mph) at Mananjary and 111 km/h (69 mph) on Île Sainte-Marie. At the same two locations, rainfall reached 207 and 134 mm (8.1 and 5.3 in), respectively. On Mauritius, the storm's passage forced the main port to close.

== See also ==
- List of wettest tropical cyclones by country
- Tropical cyclones in the Mascarene Islands
- Cyclone Dina (2002) – produced heavy rainfall on Réunion.
