= 1979–80 South-West Indian Ocean cyclone season =

Cyclone season in the Southwest Indian Ocean

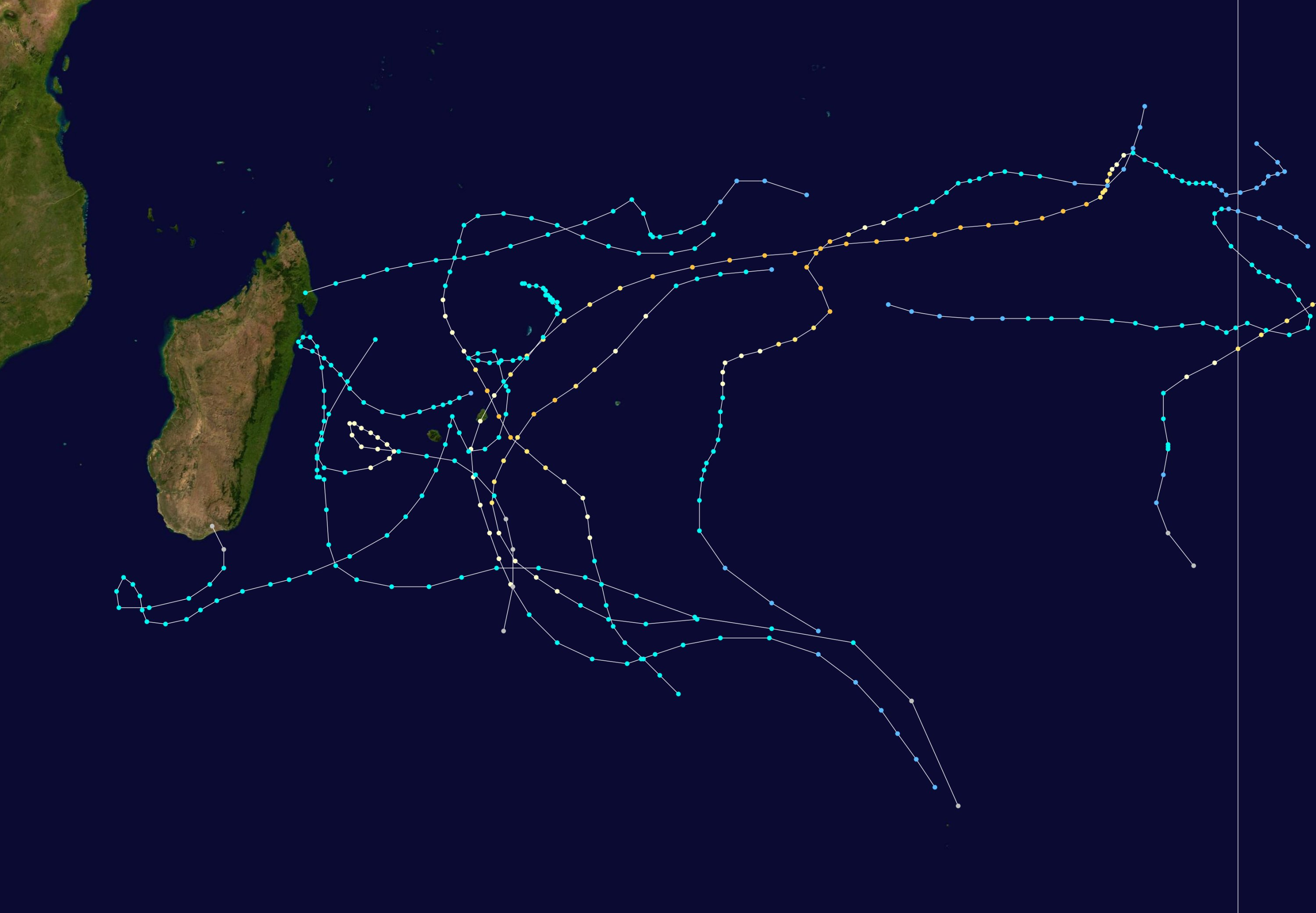
- Season summary map

Seasonal boundaries
- First system formed: August 30, 1979
- Last system dissipated: March 20, 1980

Strongest storm
- Name: Viola-Claudette
  - Maximum winds: 205 km/h (125 mph) (10-minute sustained)
  - Lowest pressure: 930 hPa (mbar)

Seasonal statistics
- Total depressions: 11
- Total storms: 11
- Tropical cyclones: 4
- Intense tropical cyclones: 2
- Total fatalities: 30
- Total damage: $342 million (1980 USD)

Related articles
- 1979–80 Australian region cyclone season; 1979–80 South Pacific cyclone season

The 1979–80 South-West Indian Ocean cyclone season was an above-average cyclone season, and is most notable for featuring the wettest tropical cyclone ever recorded, Cyclone Hyacinthe. The season officially ran from November 1, 1979, to April 30, 1980.

== Systems ==
=== Intense Tropical Cyclone Albine ===
- Intense tropical cyclone (MFR)
- Category 2 tropical cyclone (SSHWS)
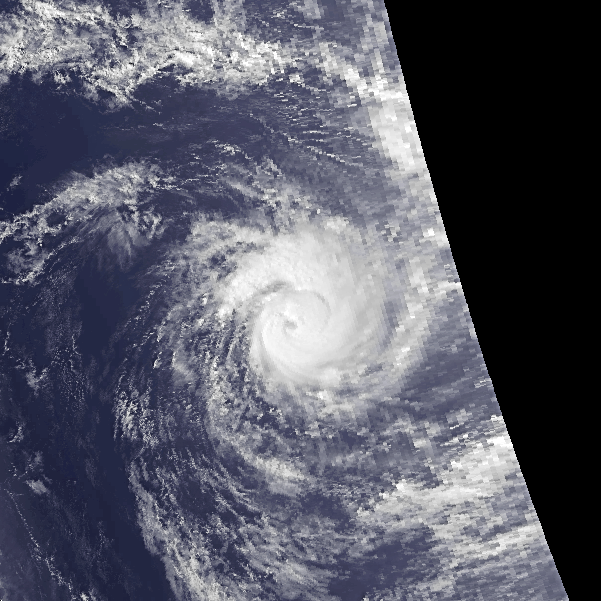
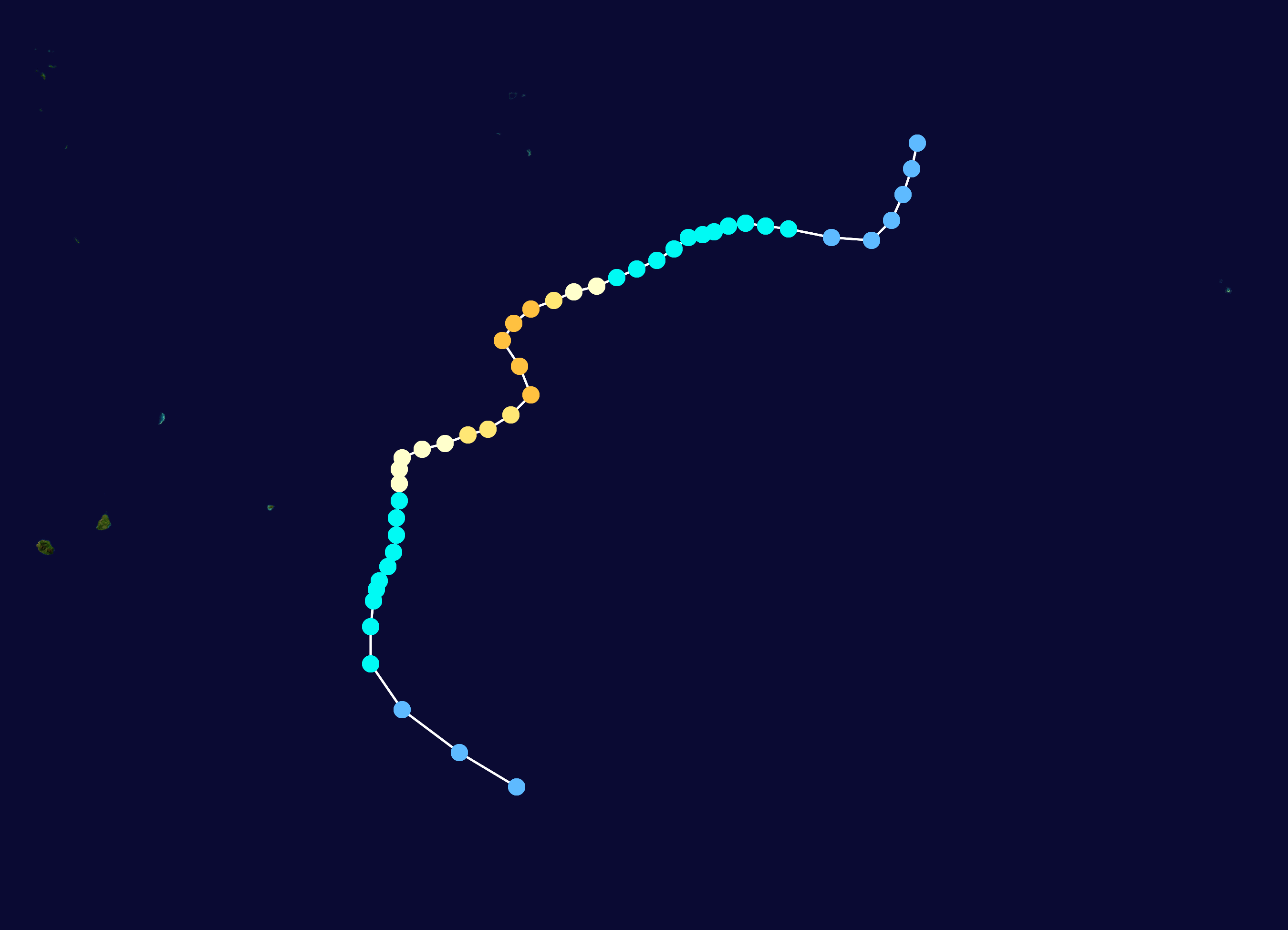
- Duration: November 25 – December 6
- Peak intensity: 195 km/h (120 mph) (10-min); 960 hPa (mbar)

Albine existed from 25 November to 6 December.

=== Intense Tropical Cyclone Viola–Claudette ===
- Intense tropical cyclone (MFR)
- Category 3 tropical cyclone (SSHWS)
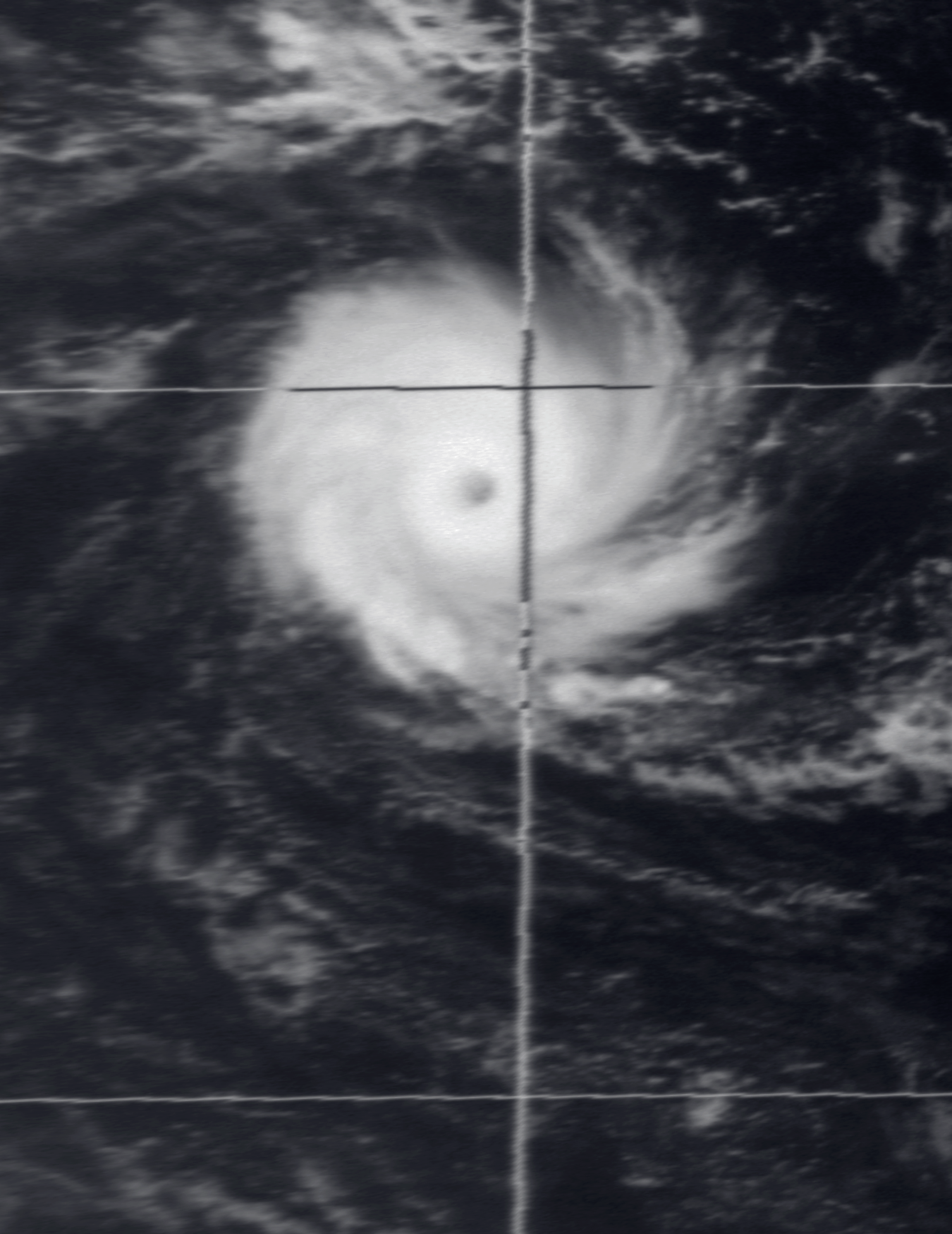
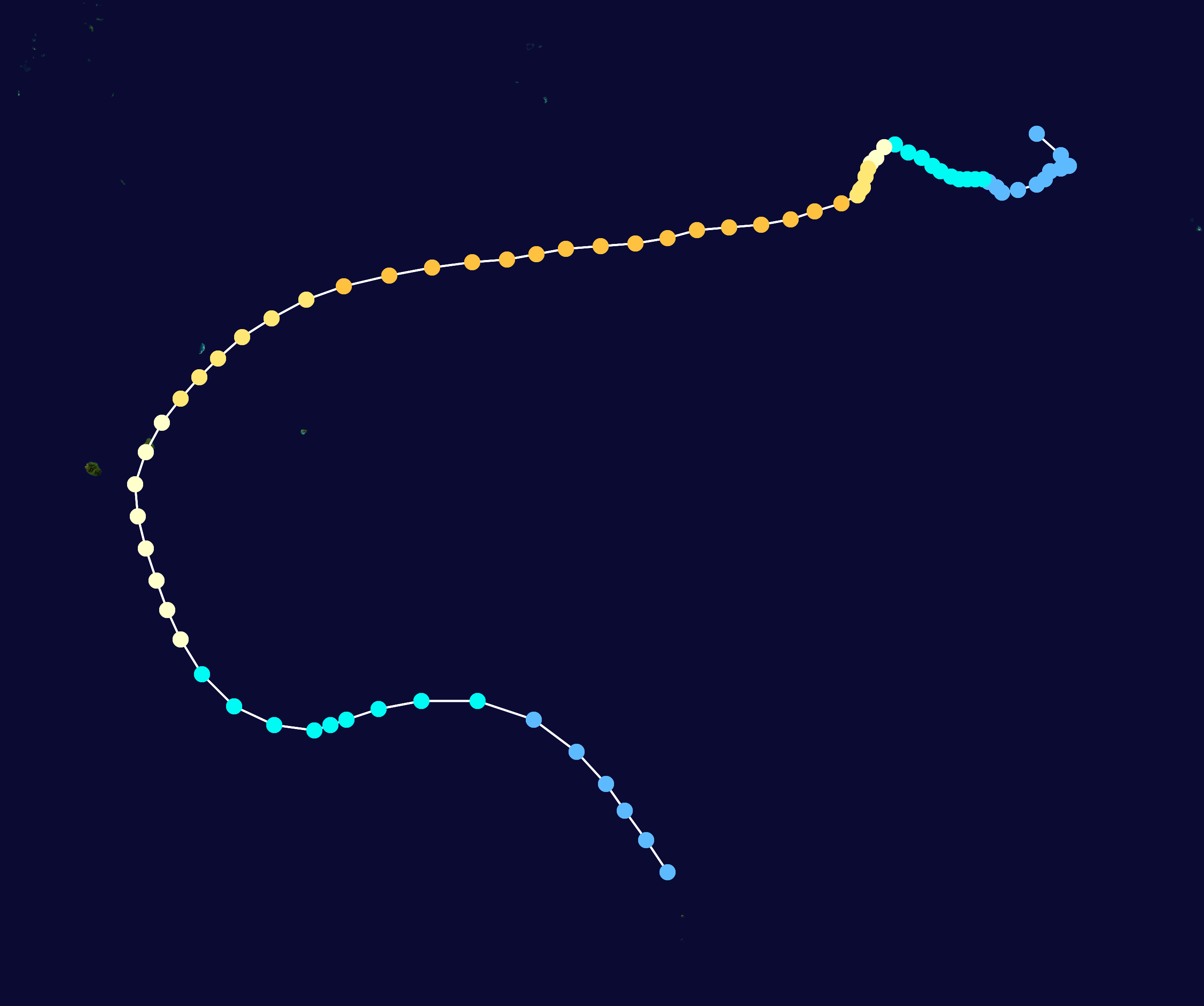
- Duration: December 18 (Crossed 80°E) – December 28
- Peak intensity: 215 km/h (130 mph) (10-min); 955 hPa (mbar)

Cyclone Viola entered the basin on December 18 from the Australian region, whereupon it became Cyclone Claudette. After passing southeast of St. Brandon, Claudette struck Mauritius on December 22, producing wind gusts of 221 km/h (137 mph). The storm caused 5 fatalities, 257 injuries, and US$175 million in damage on the island. About 5,000 houses were destroyed or severely damaged. Effects on neighboring Réunion were limited to 79 km/h (49 mph) wind gusts and some rainfall.

=== Moderate Tropical Storm Berenice ===
- Moderate tropical storm (MFR)
- Tropical storm (SSHWS)
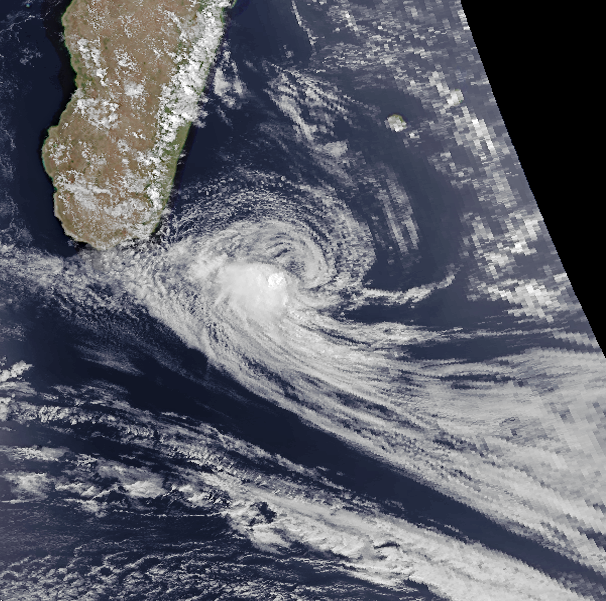
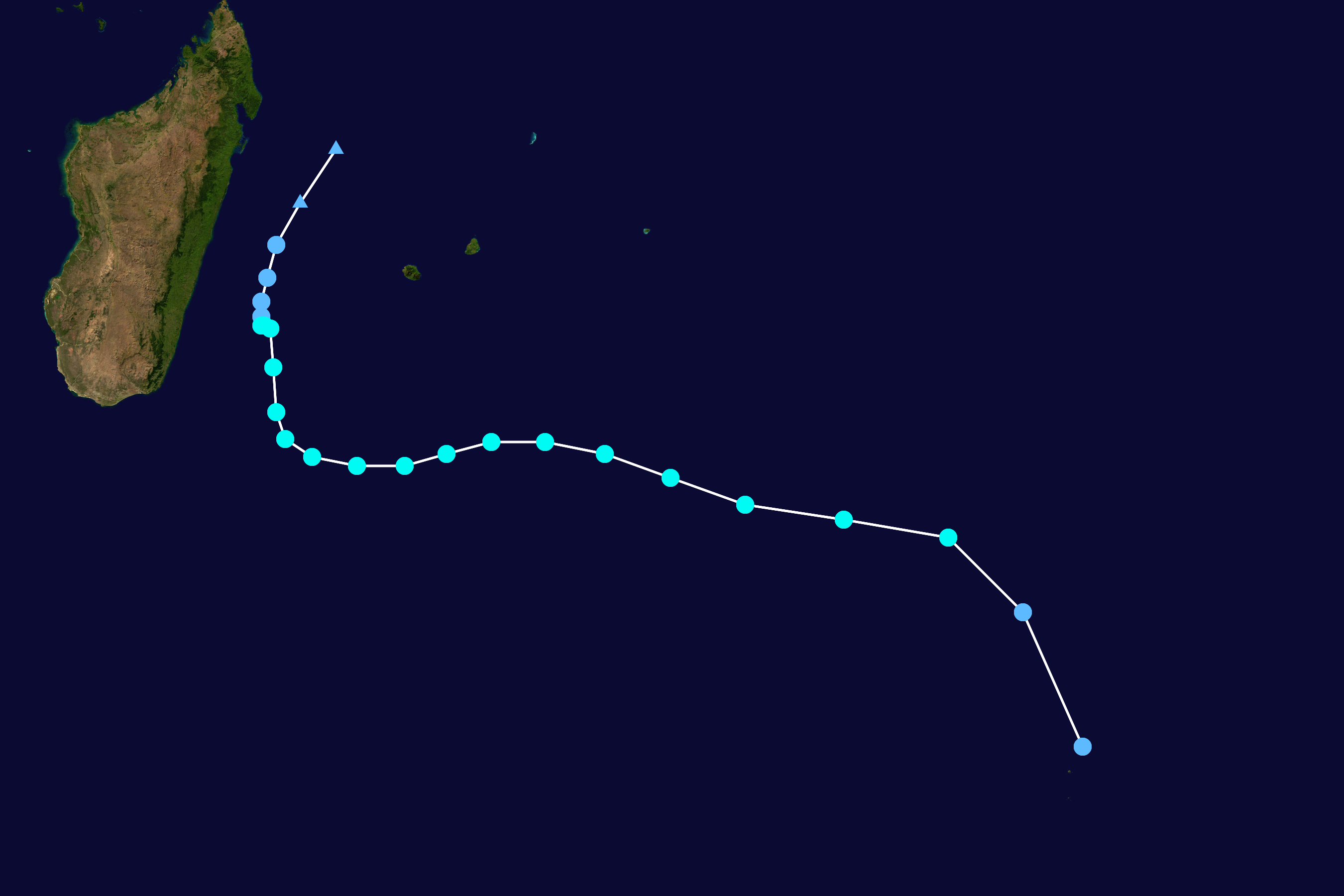
- Duration: December 15 – December 21
- Peak intensity: 65 km/h (40 mph) (10-min); 1000 hPa (mbar)

Berenice existed from 15 December to 21 December.

=== Tropical Depression Wilf–Danitza ===
- Tropical depression (MFR)
- Tropical storm (SSHWS)
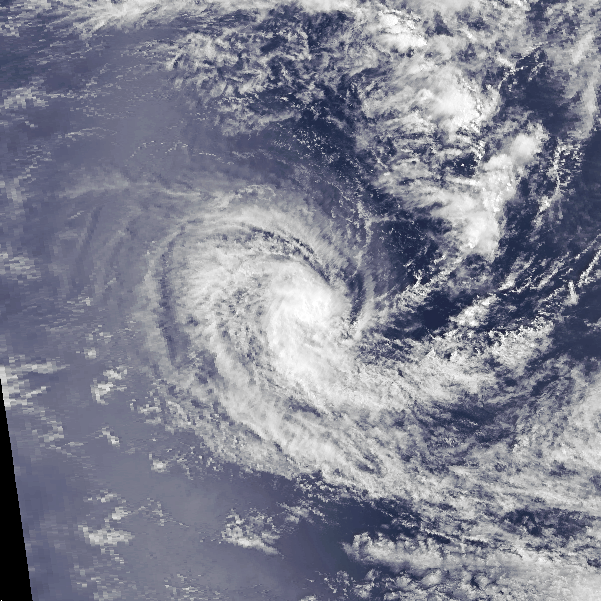
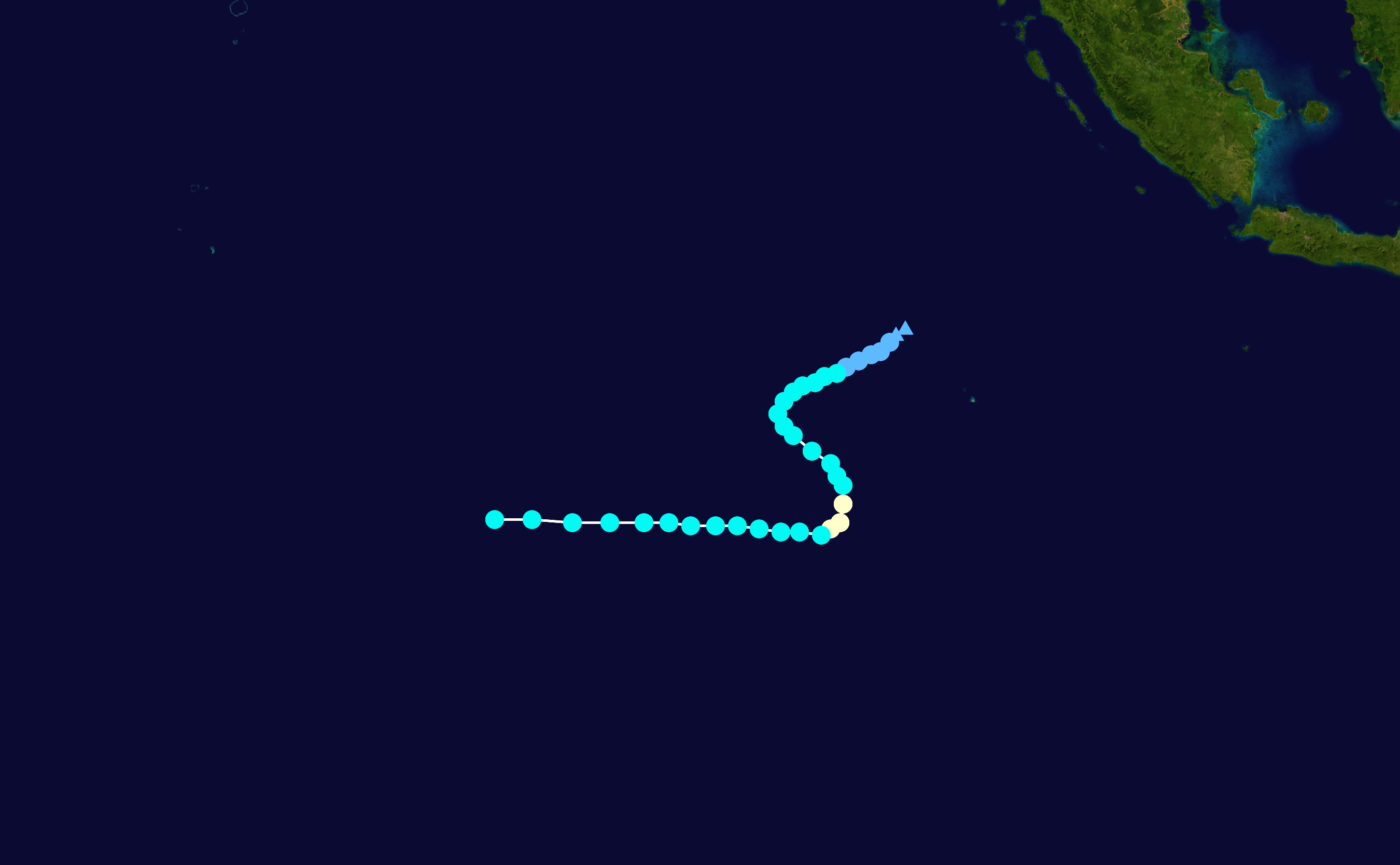
- Duration: December 23 – January 3
- Peak intensity: 55 km/h (35 mph) (10-min); 1000 hPa (mbar)

Wilf-Danitza existed from 23 December 1979, to 3 January 1980.

=== Intense Tropical Cyclone Hyacinthe ===
- Intense tropical cyclone (MFR)
- Category 1 tropical cyclone (SSHWS)
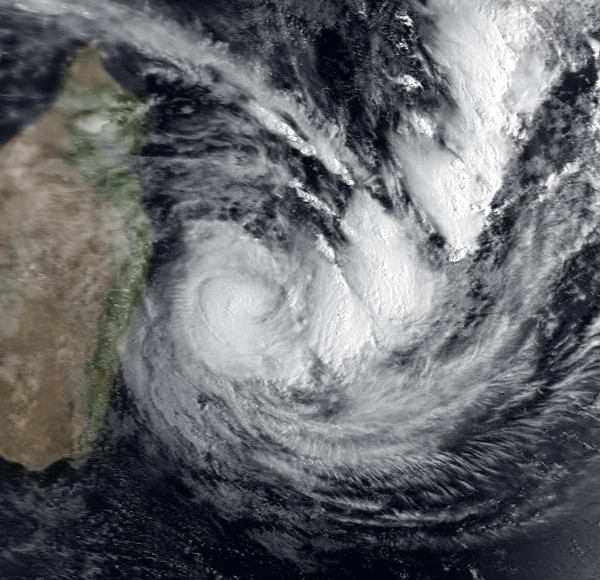
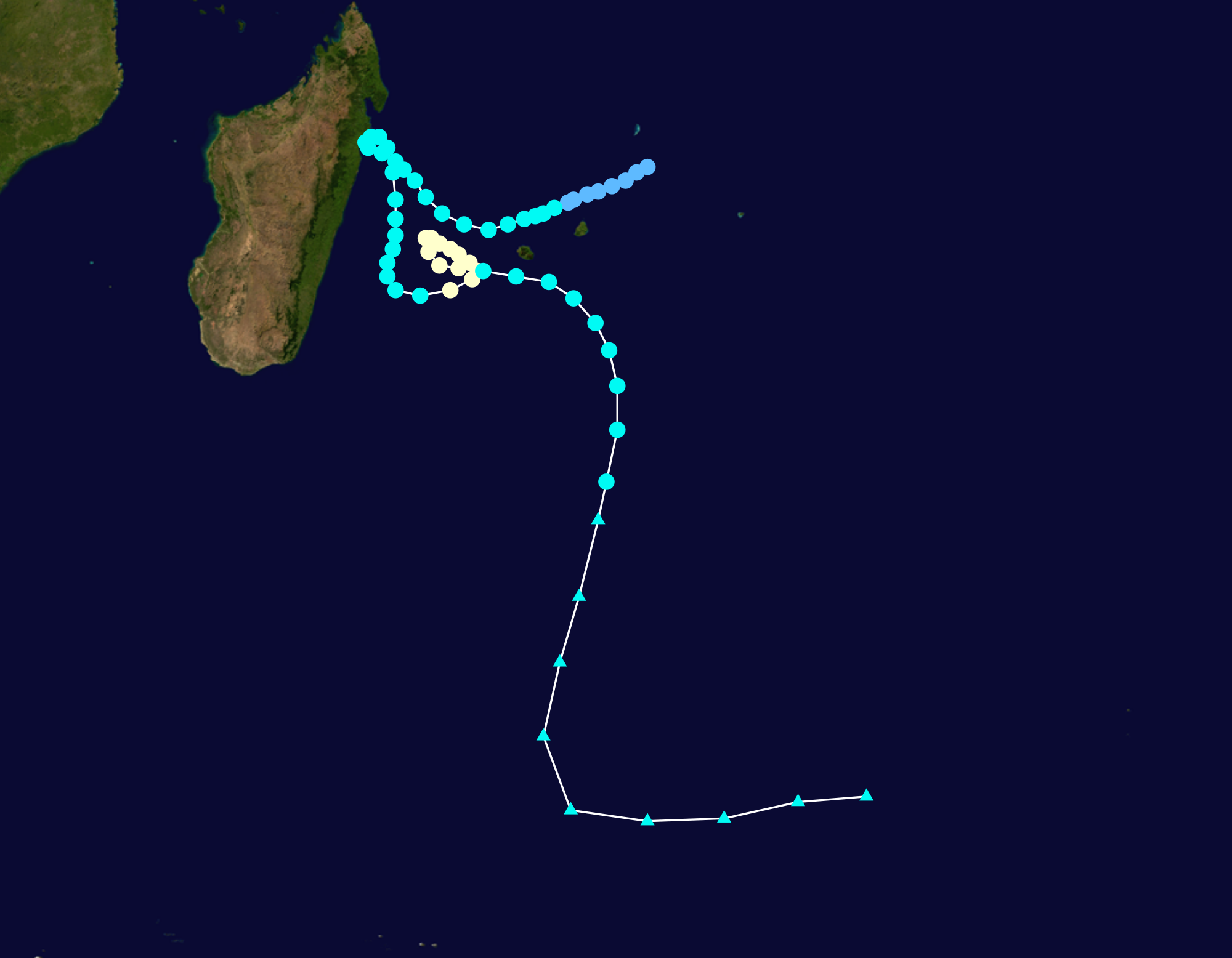
- Duration: January 15 – January 31
- Peak intensity: 165 km/h (105 mph) (10-min); 960 hPa (mbar)

Hyacinthe formed on January 15, 1980, to the northeast of Mauritius in the southern Indian Ocean. Initially it moved to the west-southwest, and while slowly intensifying it passed north of the French overseas department of Réunion. On January 19, Météo-France estimated that the storm had intensified to a tropical cyclone. Hyacinthe looped to the south of eastern Madagascar and weakened, although it restrengthened after turning to the east. The storm executed another loop to the southwest of Réunion, passing near the island for a second and later third time. Hyacinthe became extratropical on January 29 after turning southward, dissipating two days later.

Tropical Cyclone Hyacinthe set several worldwide tropical cyclone rainfall records in Réunion in the Southwestern Indian Ocean, including a peak total of 5678 mm (223.5 inches). For twelve days, Hyacinthe dropped torrential rainfall on Réunion; nearly all of the island received more than 1 m (3.3 ft) of precipitation. Over a 15‑day period from January 14 to January 28, 6,083 mm (239.5 in) of rainfall were recorded at Commerson's Crater, a volcano. The heaviest rainfall occurred through a process called orographic lift in the mountainous interior, leading to hundreds of landslides. Widespread floods washed out roads and isolated three villages. Hyacinthe caused heavy damage to crops and damaged or destroyed 2,000 houses. Losses from the storm totaled $167 million (1980 USD, 676 million francs), and 25 people were killed.

=== Intense Tropical Cyclone Jacinthe ===
- Intense tropical cyclone (MFR)
- Category 3 tropical cyclone (SSHWS)
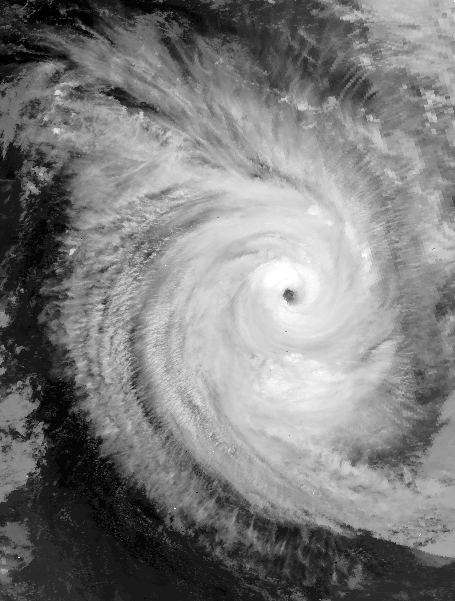
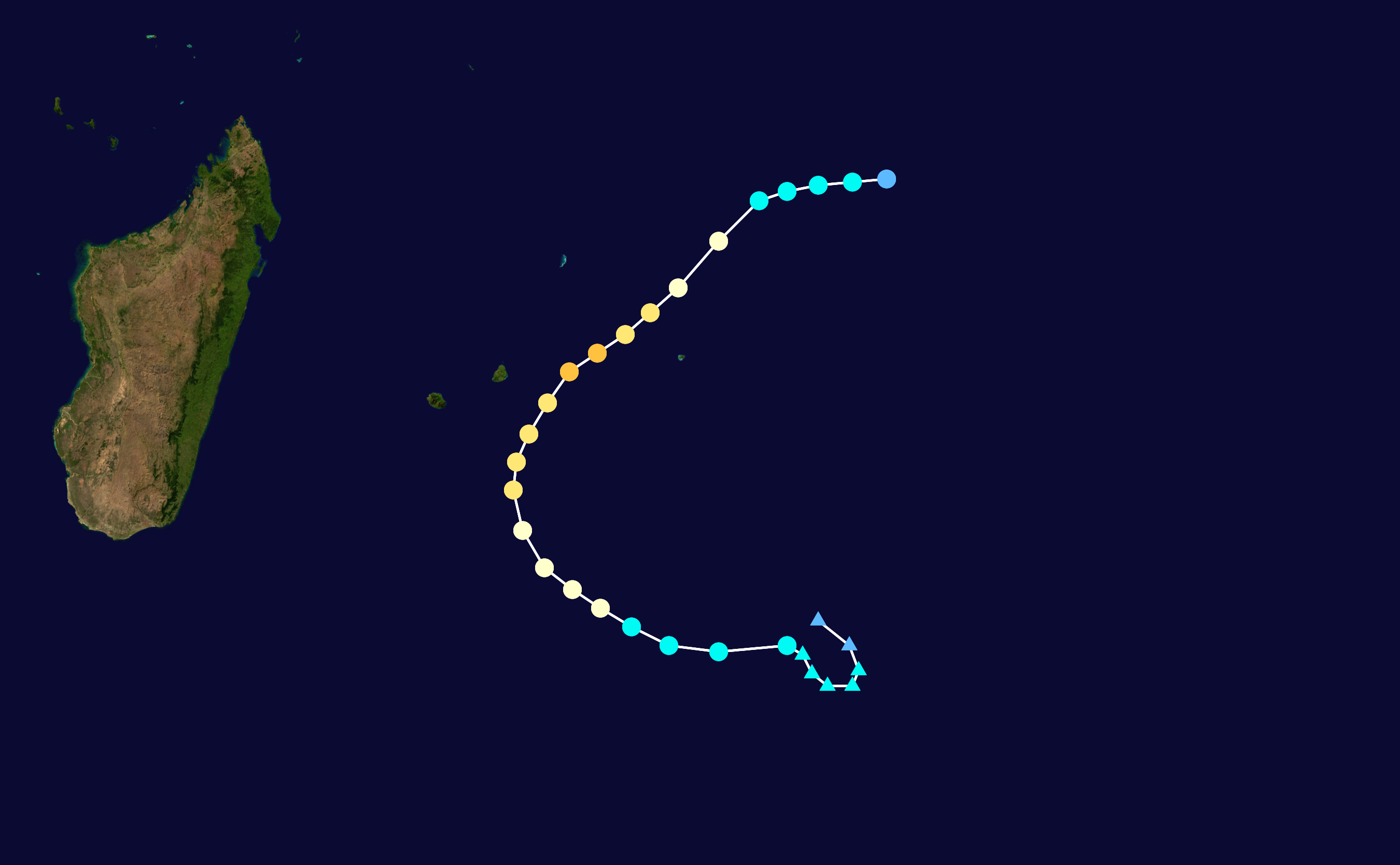
- Duration: February 1 – February 7
- Peak intensity: 185 km/h (115 mph) (10-min); 955 hPa (mbar)

Jacinthe existed from 1 February to 7 February. On February 3, the cyclone passed between Mauritius and Rodrigues, producing wind gusts of 117 km/h (73 mph) and 119 km/h (74 mph) on the respective islands.

=== Severe Tropical Storm Kolia ===
- Severe tropical storm (MFR)
- Tropical storm (SSHWS)
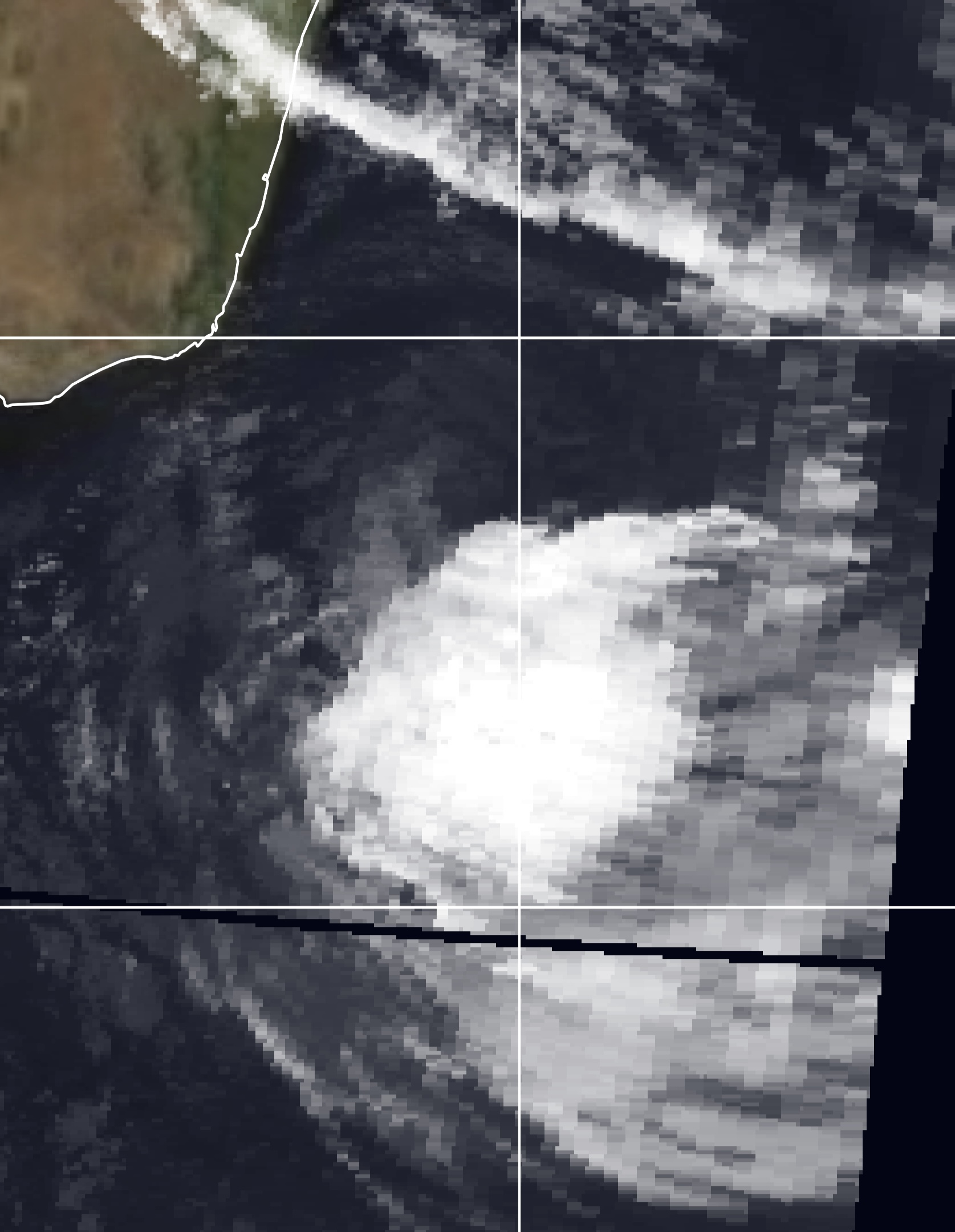
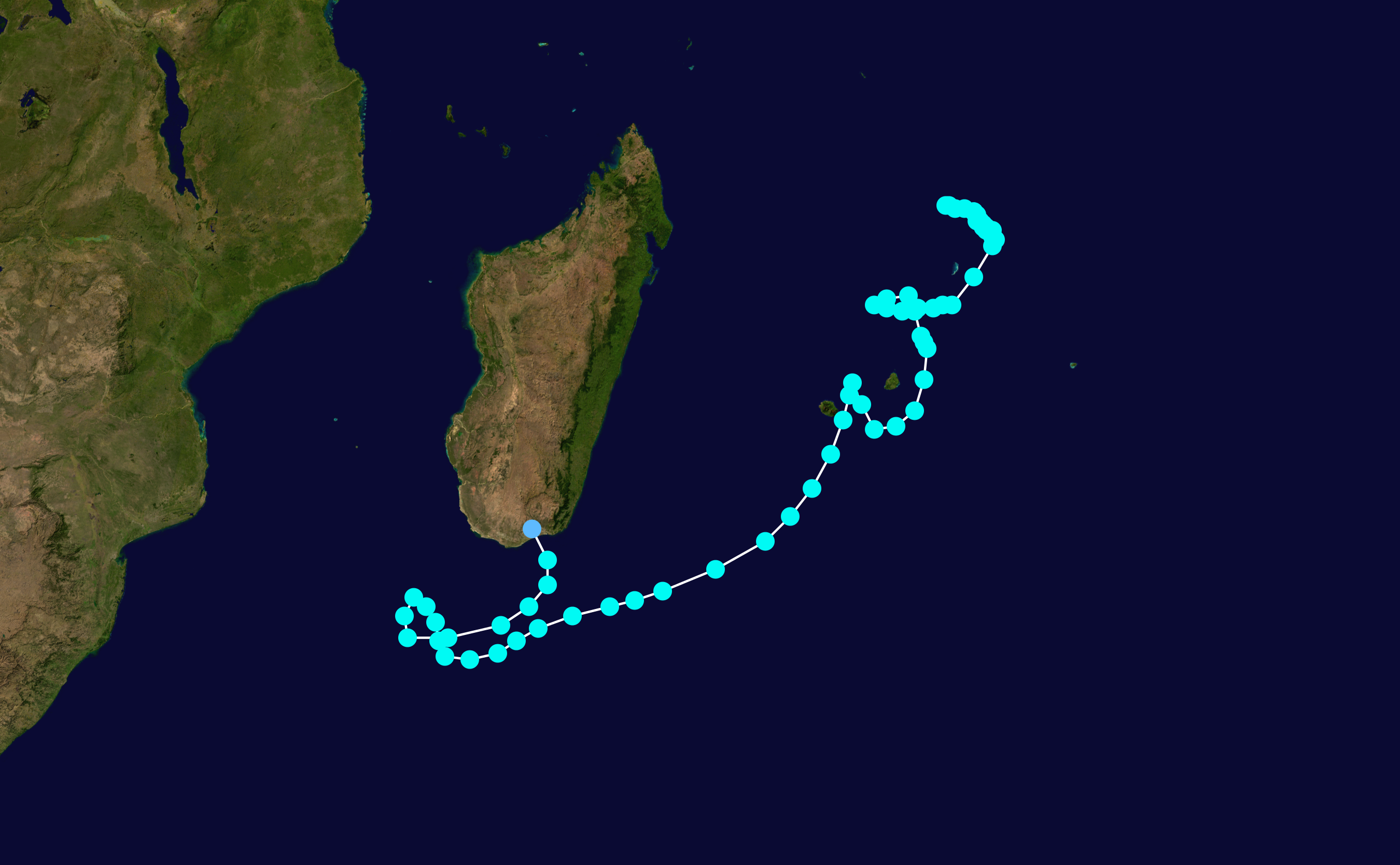
- Duration: February 25 – March 13
- Peak intensity: 110 km/h (70 mph) (10-min); 985 hPa (mbar)

Kolia existed from 25 February to 13 March. The storm executed two loops near the Mascarene Islands, bringing the storm between Réunion and Mauritius twice. Wind gusts reached 80 km/h (50 mph) on Mauritius.

=== Intense Tropical Cyclone Laure ===
- Intense tropical cyclone (MFR)
- Category 3 tropical cyclone (SSHWS)
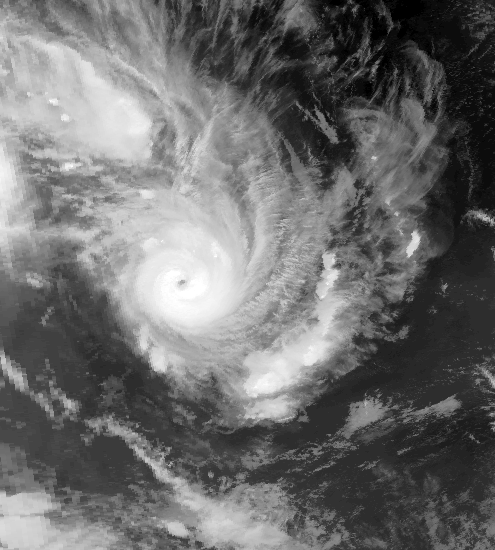
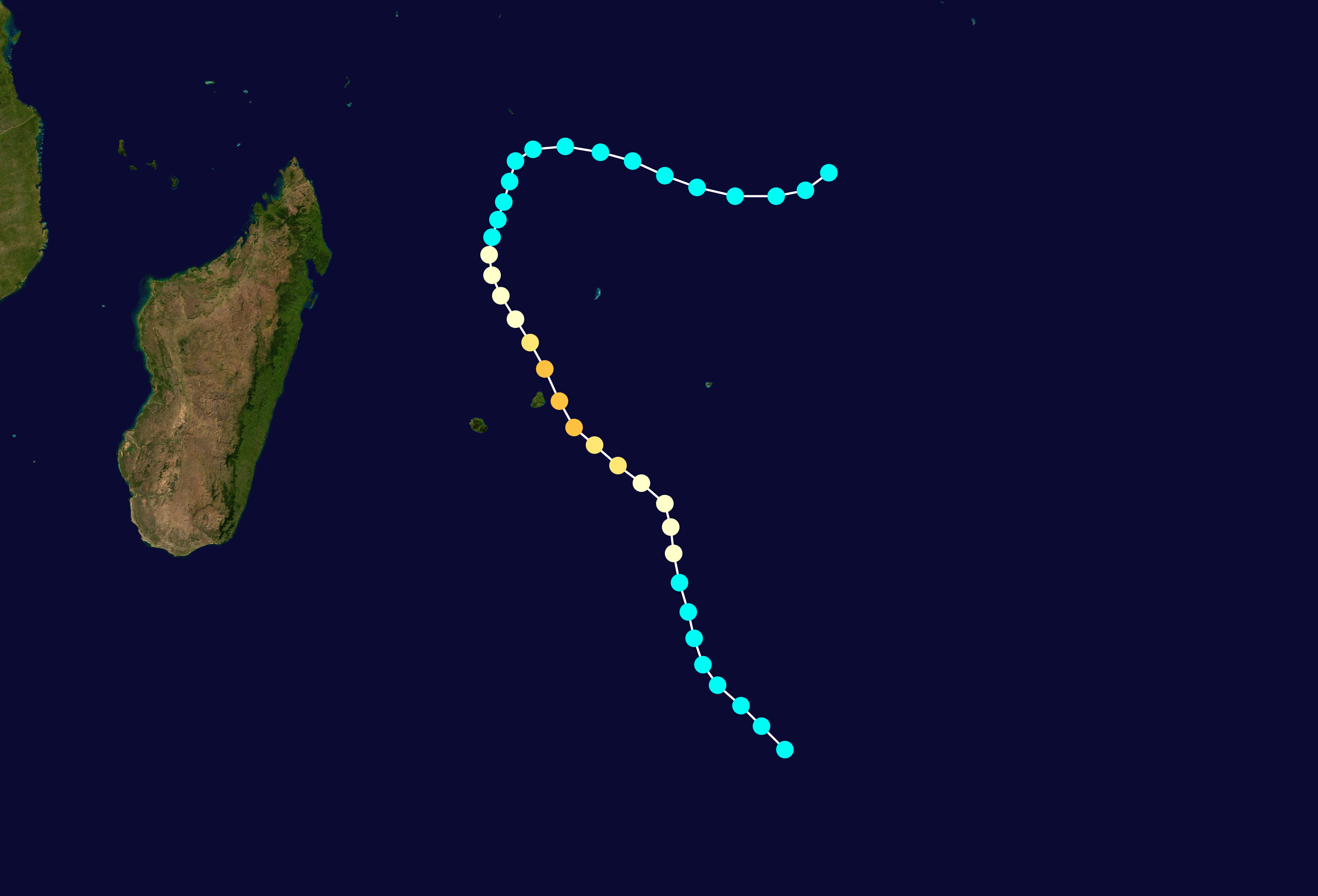
- Duration: March 8 – March 17
- Peak intensity: 165 km/h (105 mph) (10-min); 965 hPa (mbar)

Laure existed from 8 March to 17 March. On March 13, the cyclone passed just east of Mauritius, producing wind gusts of 109 km/h (68 mph) and 65.7 mm (2.59 in) of rainfall.

=== Moderate Tropical Storm 22S ===
- Moderate tropical storm (MFR)
- Tropical storm (SSHWS)
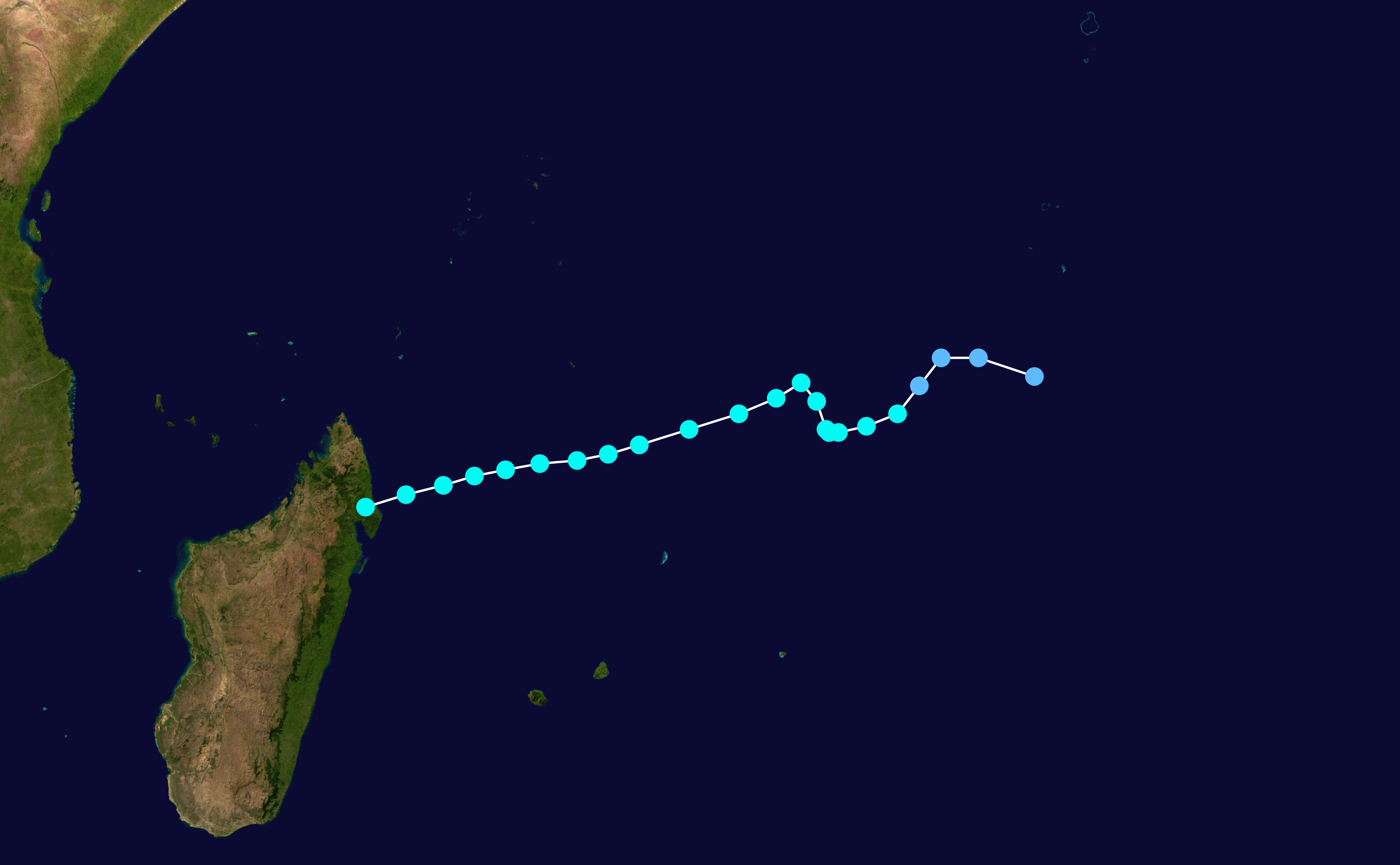
- Duration: March 14 – March 20
- Peak intensity: 85 km/h (50 mph) (10-min);

22S existed from 14 March to 20 March.

== See also ==
- Atlantic hurricane seasons: 1979, 1980
- Eastern Pacific hurricane seasons: 1979, 1980
- Western Pacific typhoon seasons: 1979, 1980
- North Indian Ocean cyclone seasons: 1979, 1980
