= List of the wettest tropical cyclones =

This is a list of the wettest tropical cyclones, listing all tropical cyclones known to have dropped at least 1,270 millimetres (50 in) of precipitation on a single location. Data is most complete for Australia, Cuba, Dominican Republic, Japan, Hong Kong, Mexico, Yap, Chuuk, and the United States, with fragmentary data available for other countries. The French region of Réunion holds several world records for tropical cyclone and worldwide rainfall due to rough topography of the island and its proximity to the Indian Ocean.

== Overall wettest ==
Wettest tropical cyclones and their remnants on Earth Highest-known totals
Precipitation			Storm	Location	Ref.
Rank	mm	in	Storm	Location	Ref.
1	6,433	253.3	Hyacinthe 1980	Commerson Crater, Réunion, France	
2	5,512	217.0	Gamede 2007	Commerson Crater, Réunion, France	
3	3,429	135.0	Nov. 1909 Hurricane	Silver Hill Plantation, Jamaica	
4	3,245	127.8	Nangka 2020	Hướng Hóa, Quảng Trị, Vietnam	
5	3,060	120.5	Morakot 2009	Alishan, Chiayi, Taiwan	
6	2,958	116.5	Diwa 2006	Grand-Ilet, Réunion, France	
7	2,781	109.5	Fran 1976	Hiso, Japan	
8	2,749	108.2	Carla 1967	Hsin-Liao, Taiwan	
9	2,550	100.4	Flora 1963	Santiago de Cuba, Cuba	
10	2,319	91.30	Nari 2001	Wulai, New Taipei, Taiwan	
11	2,300	90.55	1968 Severe Cyclonic Storm	Pedong, West Bengal, India	
12	2,290	90.16	Linfa 2020	A Lưới, Vietnam	
13	2,252	88.66	Jasper 2023	Bairds, Queensland	
14	2,210	87.01	July 1911 cyclone	Baguio City, Philippines	
15	2,162	85.12	Flossie 1969	Beitou, Taipei, Taiwan	
16	2,100	82.68	Namu 1986	Mount Popomanaseu, Guadalcanal, Solomon Islands	(Note: May have had a greater amount of precipitation.)
17	2,044	80.47	Batsirai 2022	Commerson Crater, Réunion, France	
18	2,000	78.74	Namtheun 2004	Kisawa, Japan	(Note: May have had a greater amount of precipitation.)
19	1,987	78.23	Herb 1996	Alishan, Chiayi, Taiwan	
20	1,947	76.65	Peter 1979	Mount Bellenden Ker, Australia	
21	1,870	73.62	Rona 1999	Mount Bellenden Ker, Australia	
22	1,854.3	73.00	Parma (Pepeng) 2009	Baguio City, Philippines	
23	1,840	72.44	Severe Cyclonic Storm ARB 01 (2004)	Aminidivi, Lakshadweep, India	
24	1,825	71.85	Denise 1966	Foc-Foc, Réunion, France	
25	1,805.5	71.08	Talas 2011	Kamikitayama, Japan	
26	1,774	69.84	Saola 2012	Yilan City, Taiwan	
27	1,773	69.8	Peipah 2007	Nam Đông, Vietnam	
28	1,700	66.93	Lynn 1987	Taipei, Taiwan	
29	1,672	65.83	Clara 1967	Dongshan, Yilan, Taiwan	
30	1,611	63.43	Sinlaku 2008	Heping, Taichung, Taiwan	
31	1,597	62.87	Mitch 1998	Picacho/Chinandega, Nicaragua	
32	1,576	62.05	Wilma 2005	Quintana Roo, Mexico	
33	1,561	61.46	Haitang 2005	Sandimen, Pingtung, Taiwan	
34	1,538.7	60.58	Harvey 2017	Nederland, Texas, United States	
35	1,546	60.87	Aere 2004	Miaoli County, Taiwan	
36	1,518.9	59.80	Olive 1971	Ebino, Japan	
37	1,500	59.06	Nakri 2014	Mount Halla, Jeju Island, South Korea	(Note: May have had a greater amount of precipitation.)
38	1,442	56.77	Hurricane John (2024)	Acapulco, Mexico	
39	1,369	53.9	Tropical Depression 06W 2007	Hương Khê, Vietnam	
40	1,360	53.54	Dina 2002	Bellecombe, Réunion, France	
41	1,340	52.76	Depression Six (1961)	Cherrapunji, Meghalaya, India	
42	1,322	52.05	Nabi 2005	Mikado, Japan	
43	1,321.2	52.02	Lane 2018	Mountainview, Hawaii, United States	
44	1,320.9	52.00	Hiki 1950	Kanalohuluhulu Ranger Station, Hawaii, United States	
45	1,318	51.89	Wanda 1974	Mount Glorious, Australia	
46	1,309	51.54	Firinga 1989	Pas de Bellecombe	
47	1,286	50.63	Kent 1992	Hidegadake, Japan	
48	1,280	50.39	Nisha (2008)	Orathanadu, Tamil Nadu, India	

== Gallery ==
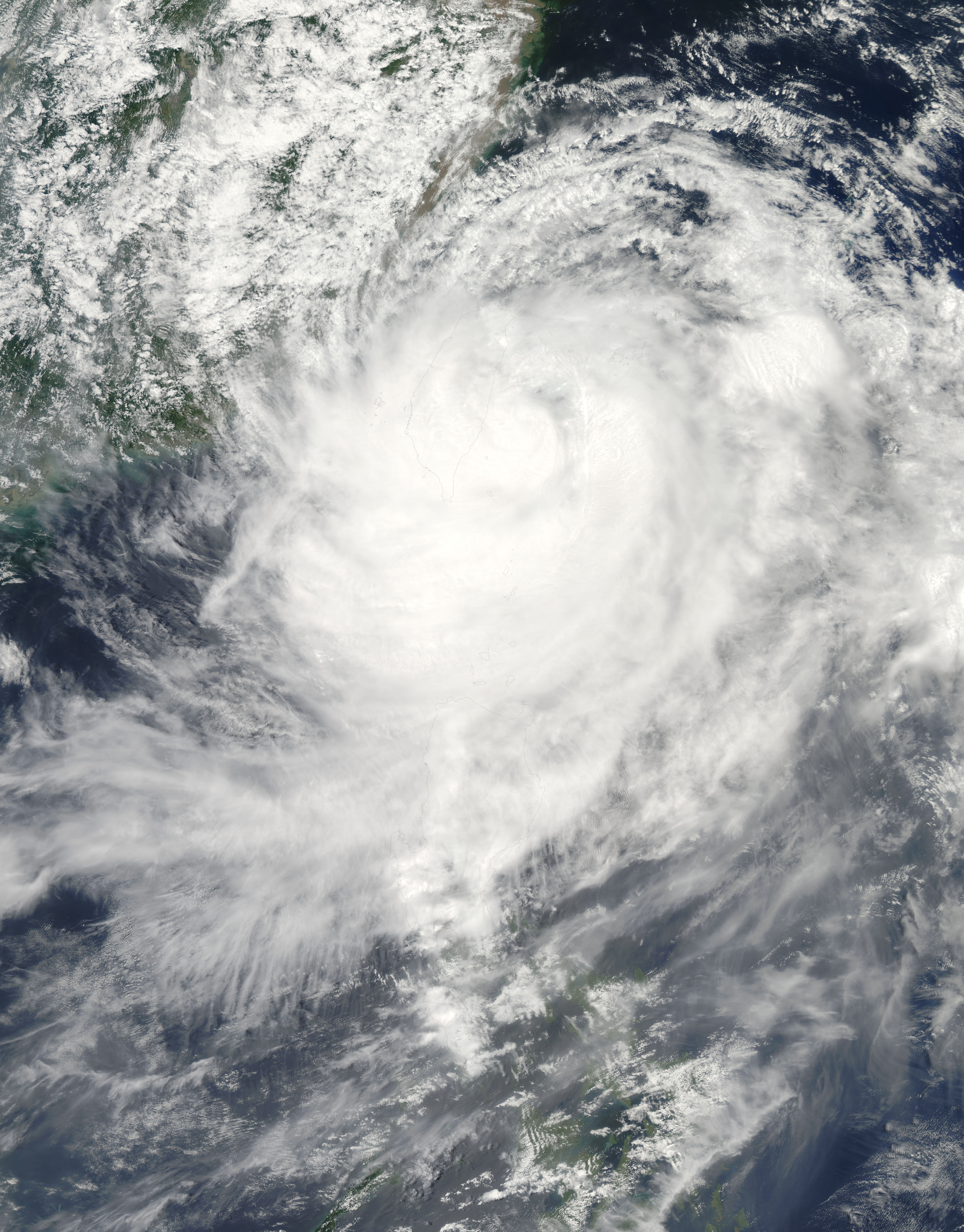
Typhoon Morakot approaching Taiwan on August 7, 2009. Due to its rugged topography, Taiwan sees extreme rain from tropical cyclones, particularly in its central mountain range.

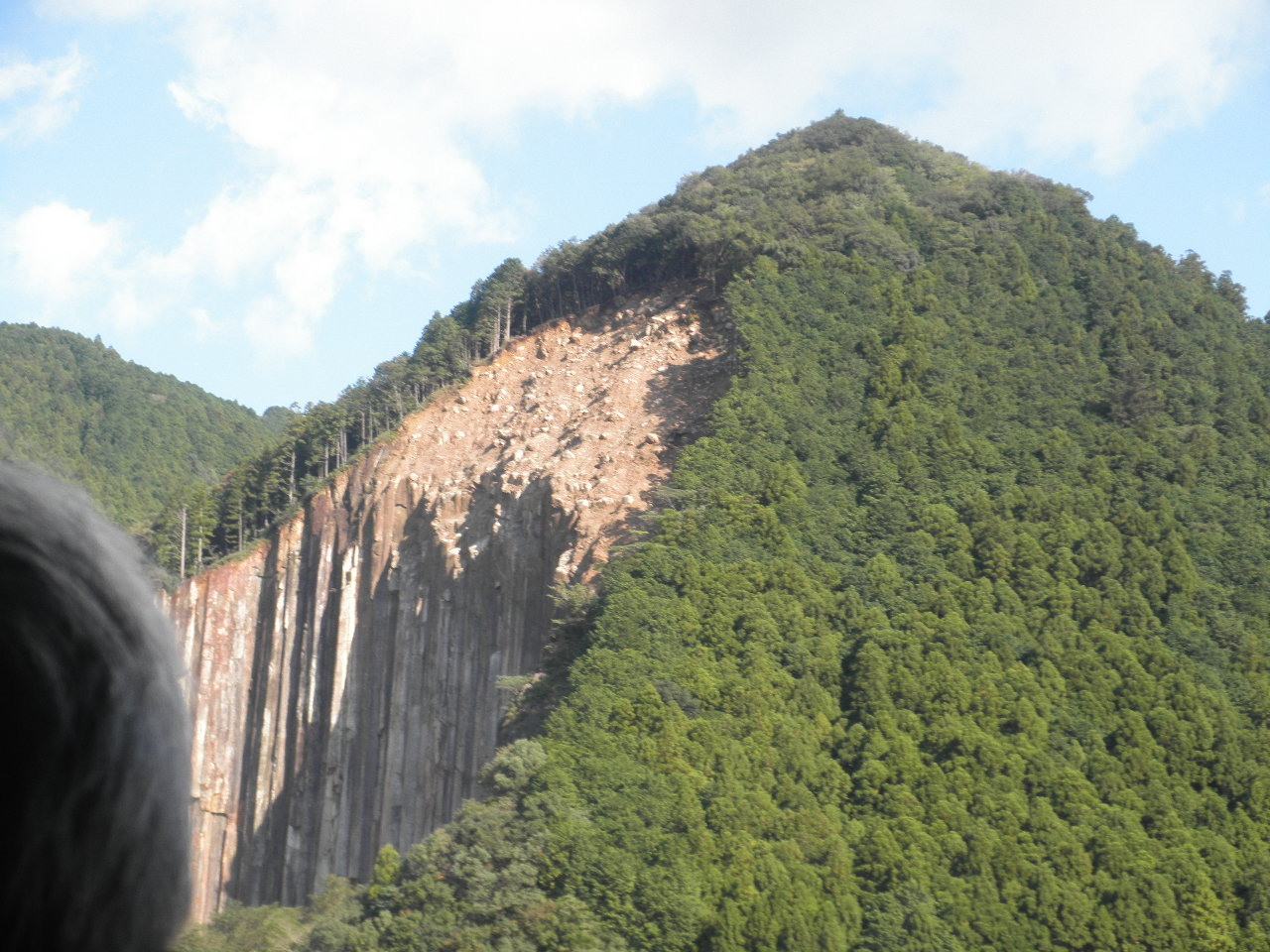
The heavy rains from Tropical Storm Talas triggered numerous landslides, such as this one in Kihō, across the mountainous terrain of Japan.

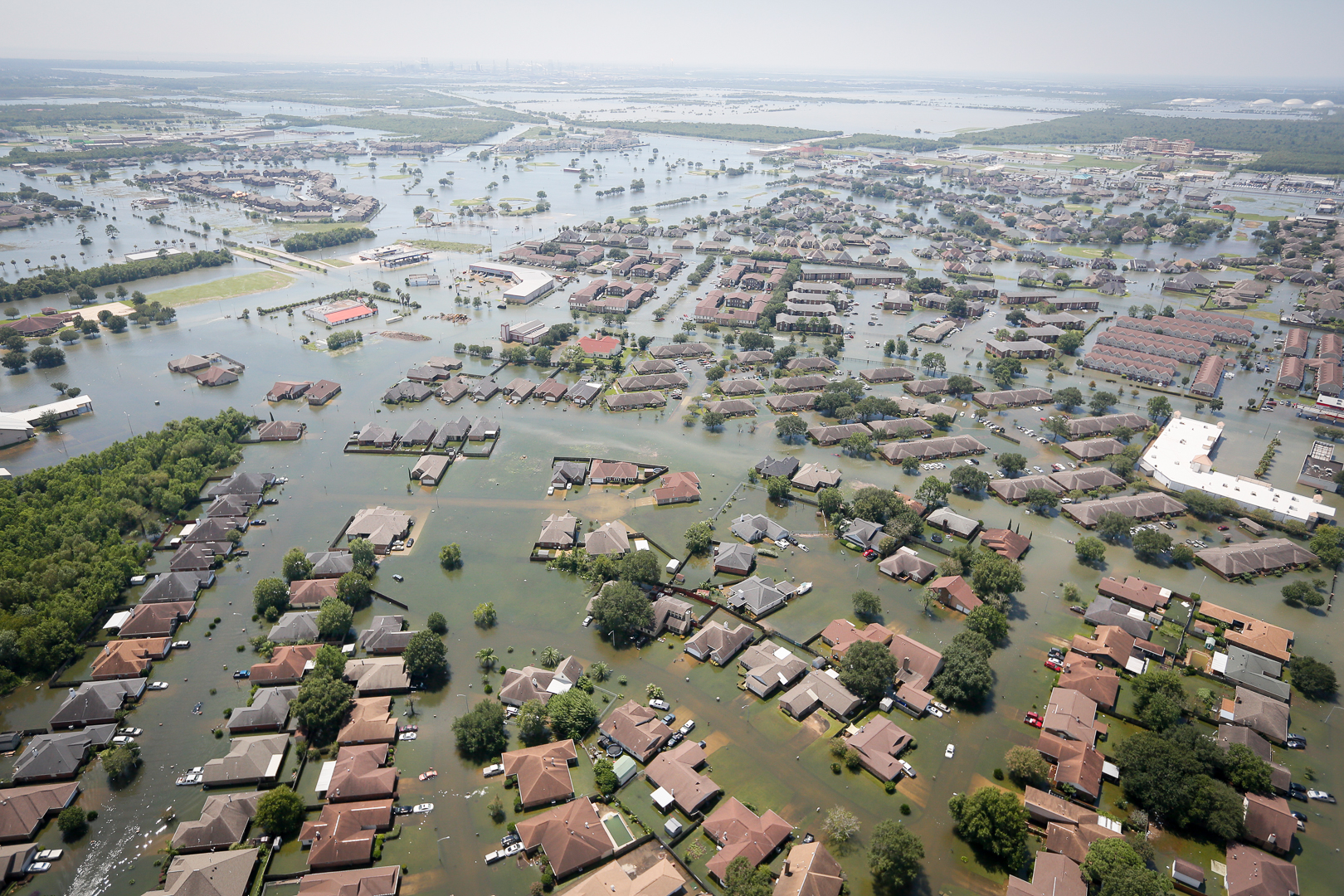
Flooding in Texas on August 31, 2017, from Hurricane Harvey. Harvey stalled over the state of Texas for two days due to high pressure ridges on both sides, resulting in massive flooding.

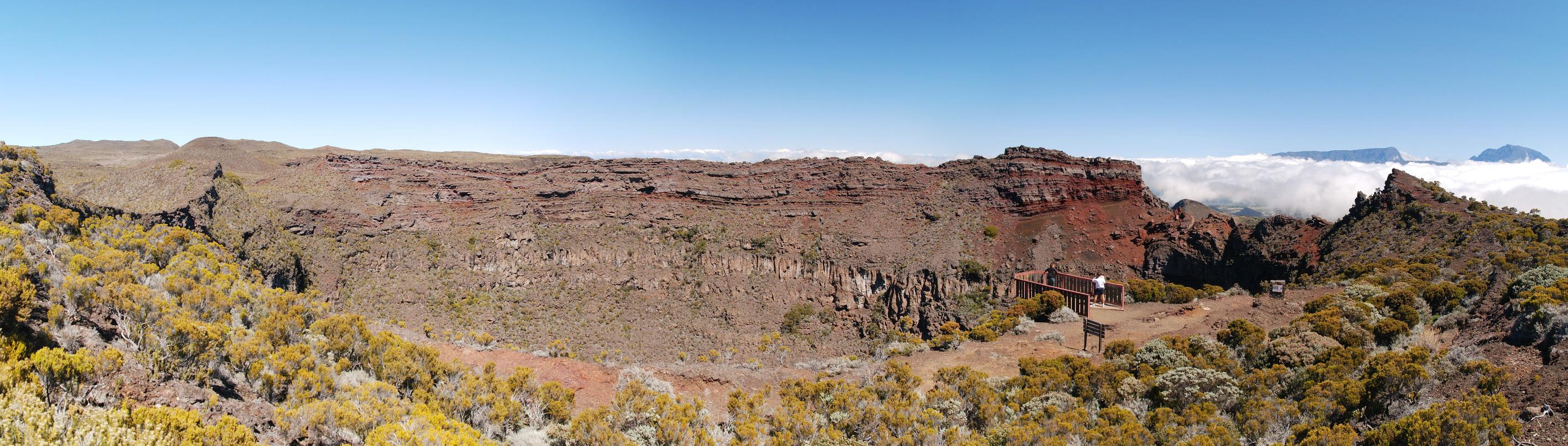
Commerson Crater in Réunion, France has received over 5.5 metres of rain from tropical cyclones on at least two separate occasions.

== See also ==
- Extratropical cyclone
- List of the most intense tropical cyclones
- List of the wettest tropical cyclones by country
- List of the wettest tropical cyclones in the United States
- List of tropical cyclone records
- Tropical cyclone rainfall climatology
- Tropical cyclone rainfall forecasting
- Tropical cyclogenesis
- Wettest known locations
