= Commerson Crater =

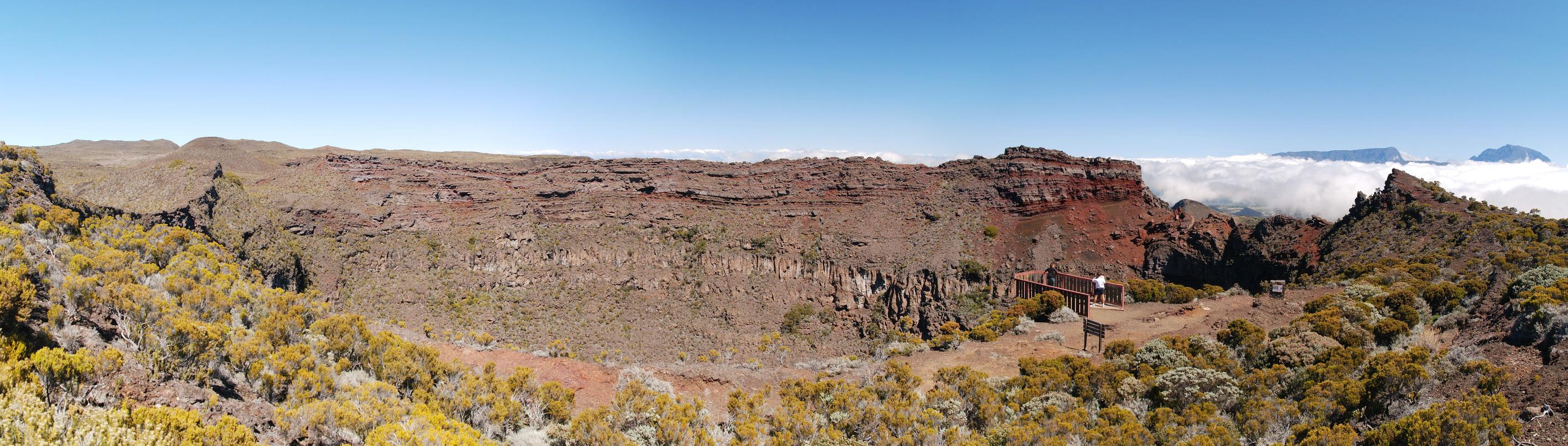
- View of the upper edge of Commerson Crater.

Highest point
- Elevation: 2,310 m (7,580 ft)
- Listing: List of volcanoes in Réunion
- Coordinates: 21°12′29″S 55°37′59″E

Geography
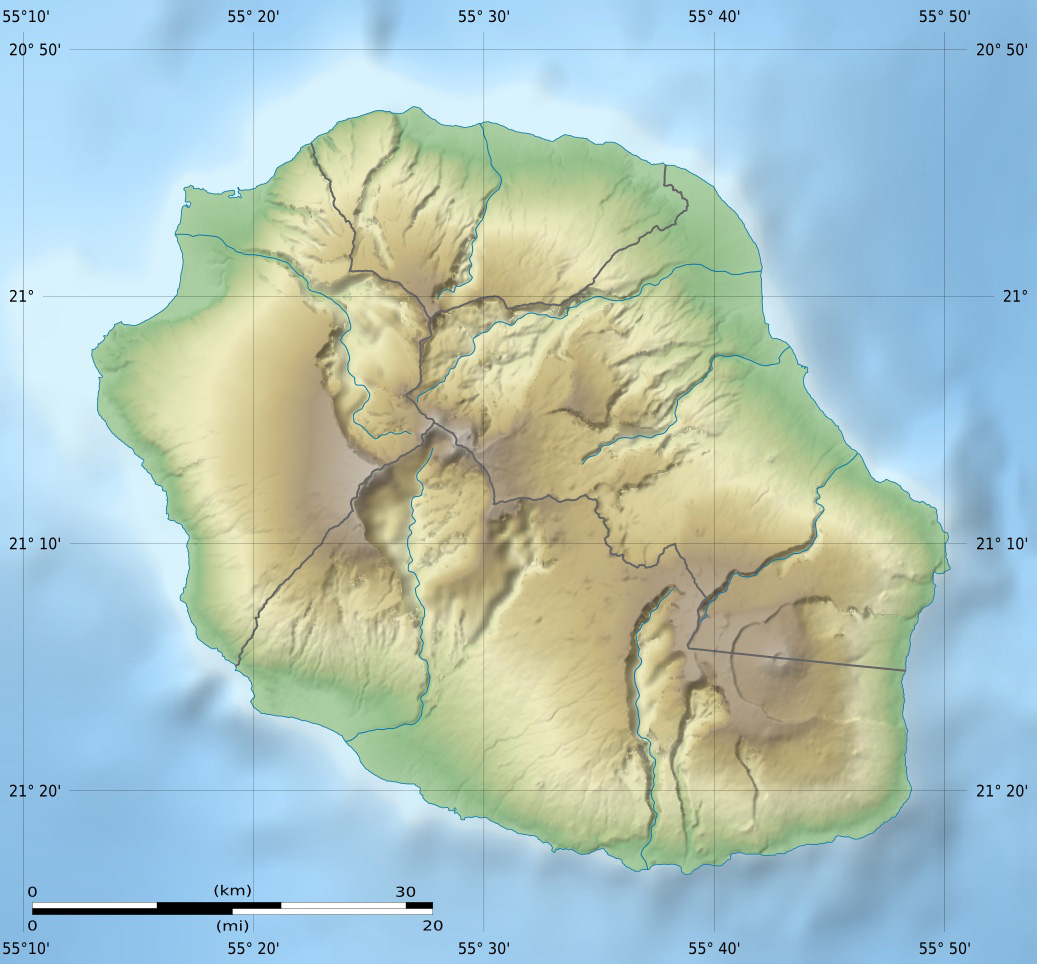
- Location within Réunion
- Location: Réunion, France
- Parent range: Les Hauts

Geology
- Mountain type: Caldera

Commerson Crater is a caldera in the mountains of Réunion, an overseas department of France. Located in the municipal territory of Saint-Joseph, it is part of the Piton de la Fournaise, a shield volcano on the eastern end of Réunion Island, but is located outside of the Enclos Fouqué, the volcano's most recent caldera.

The caldera was named in honor of Philibert Commerson, a French explorer.

== Climate ==
Due to its elevated position, Commerson Crater receives considerable amounts of rainfall, especially during tropical storms. During Cyclone Hyacinthe in January 1980, it received 6.43 metres (253 in) of rainfall in 15 days, the most precipitation dropped by a tropical cyclone in a single location. The second greatest amount of rainfall in a single tropical cyclone also occurred in Commerson Crater, when Cyclone Gamede dropped 5.51 metres (217 in) of rain in 2007. No other place has received even 3.50 metres (138 in) of rainfall from a single tropical cyclone.

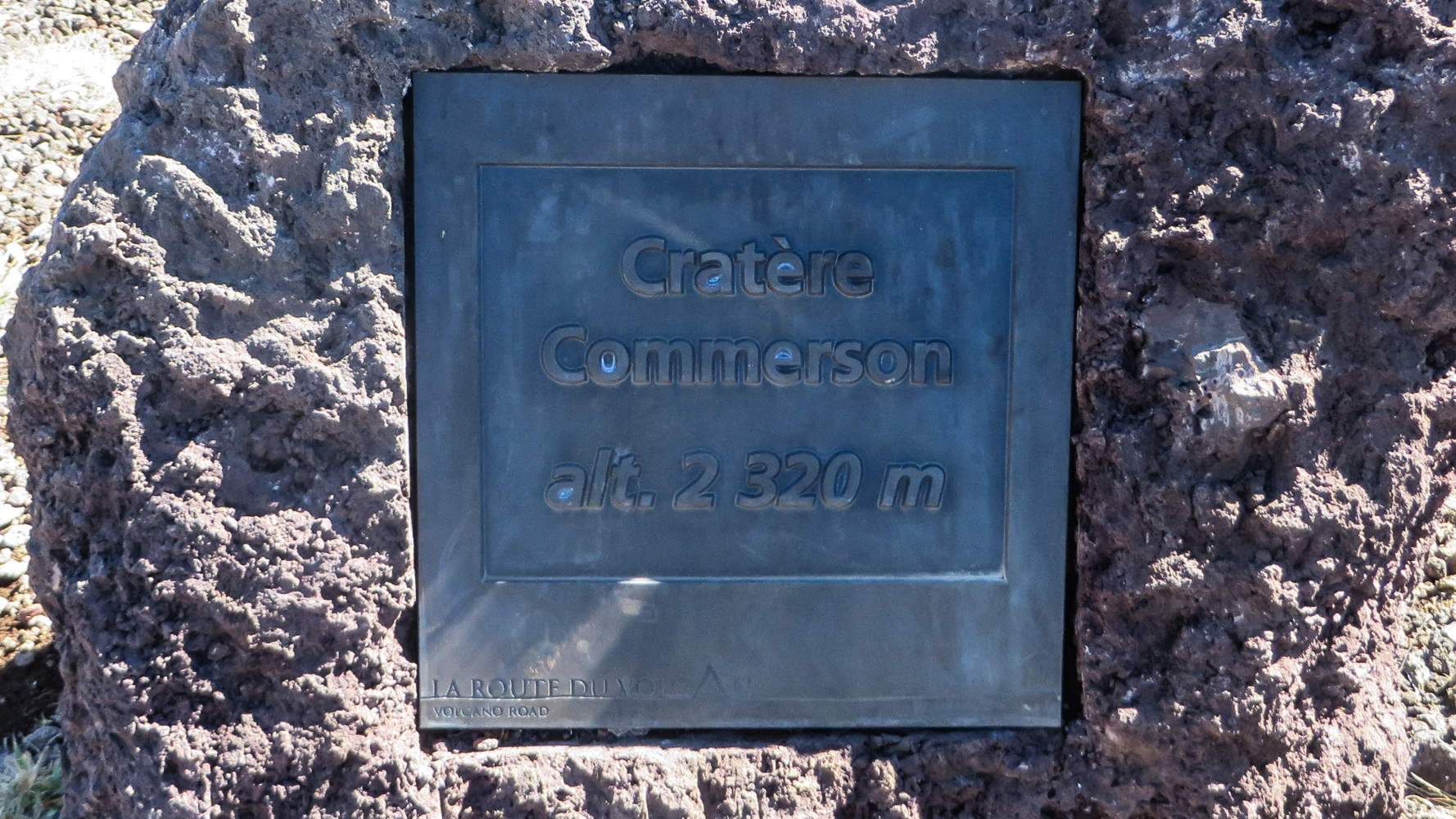
Indicator

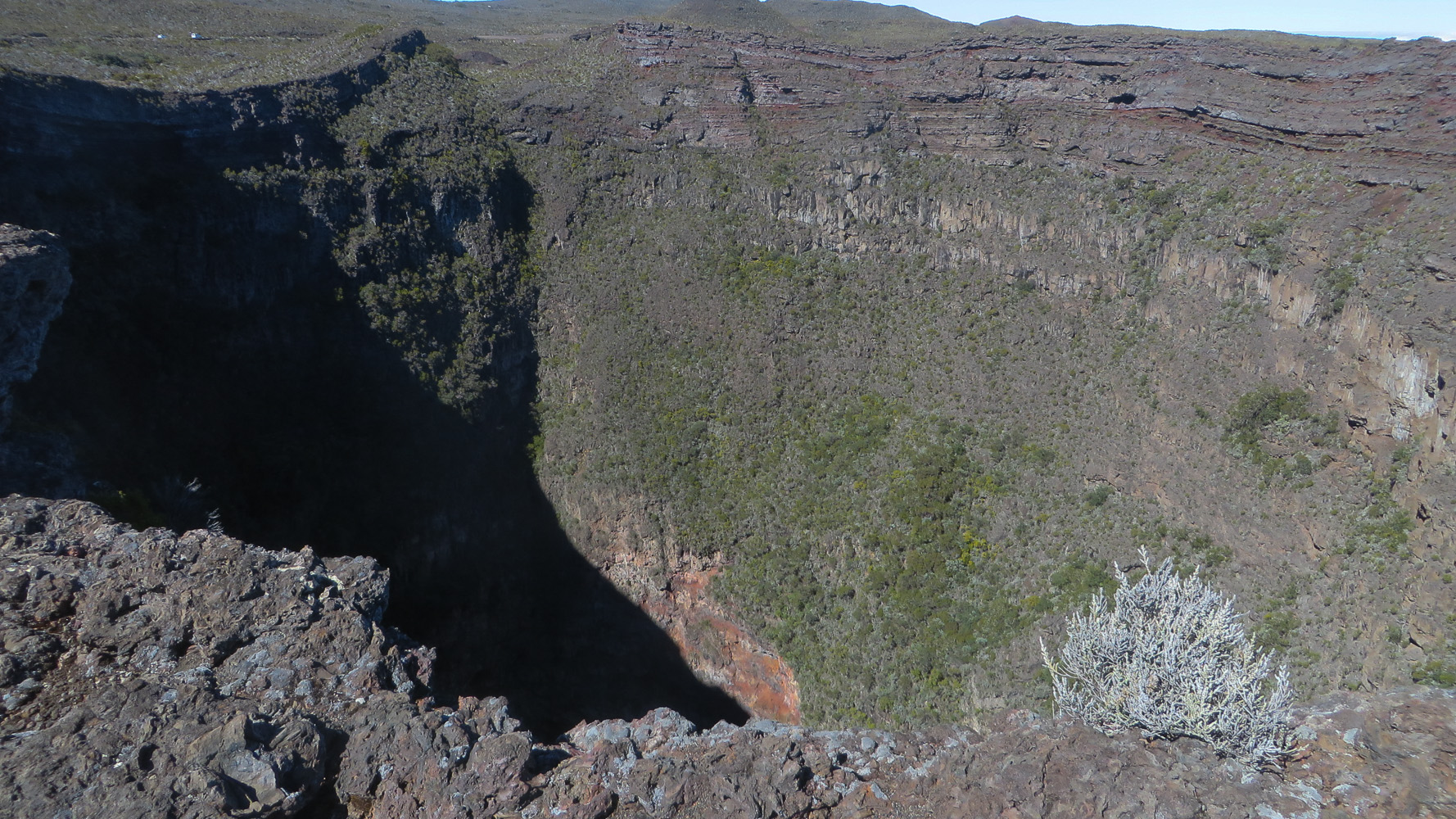
Crater of Commerson volcano

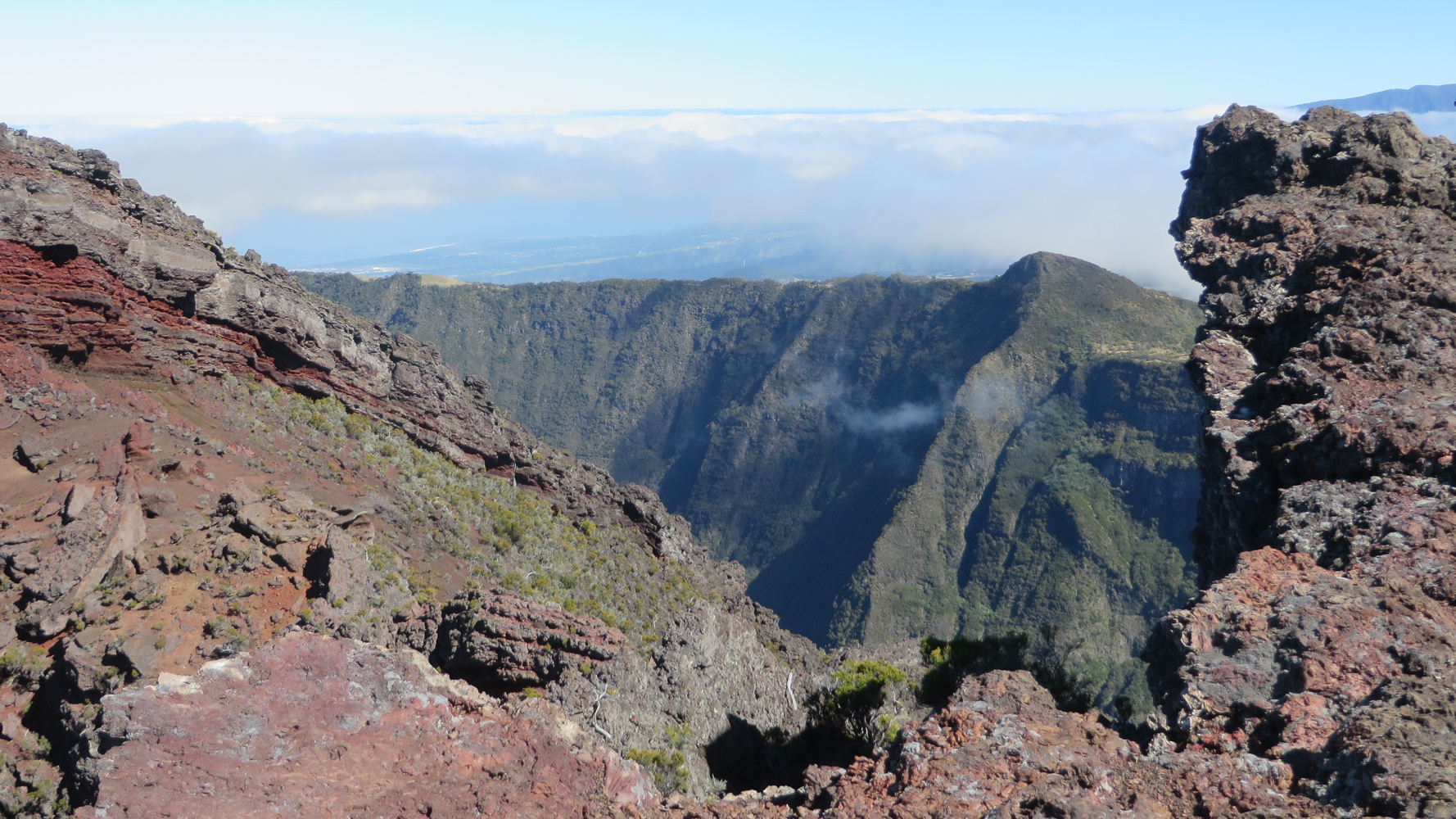
View from this area

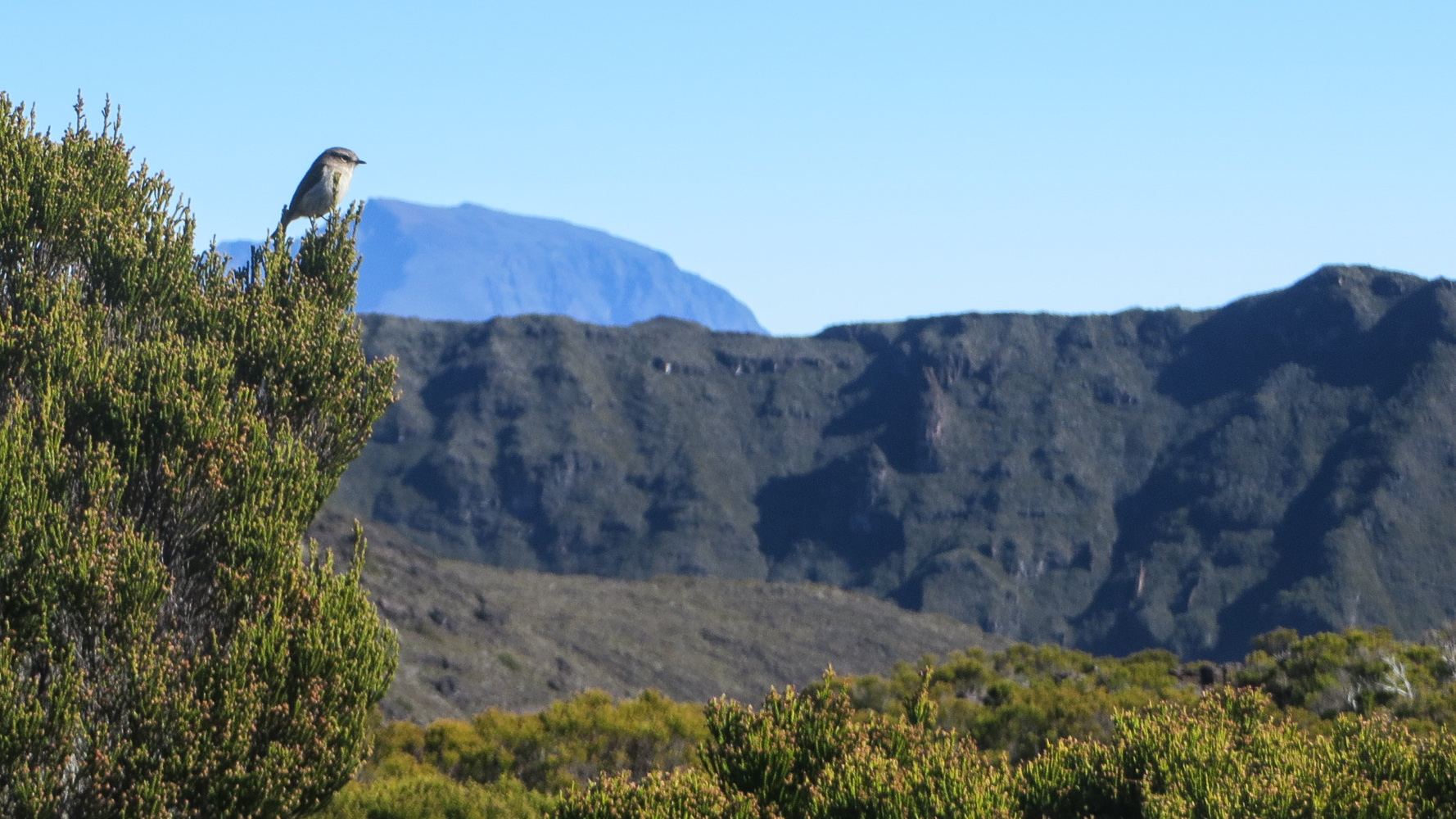
View of Piton des Neiges from Commerson
