= List of volcanoes in Réunion =

This is a list of active and extinct volcanoes of Réunion, an overseas department of France.

Name	Elevation		Location	Last eruption
Name	(m)	(ft)	Coordinates	Last eruption
Commerson Crater	2310	7580	21.20797°S 55.63295°E	
Piton de la Fournaise	2632	8635	21.231°S 55.713°E	18 January 2026
Piton des Neiges	3069	10069	21.05°S 55.29°E	20,000 BC
