= Cyclone Gamede =

South-West Indian cyclone in 2007

Intense Tropical Cyclone Gamede
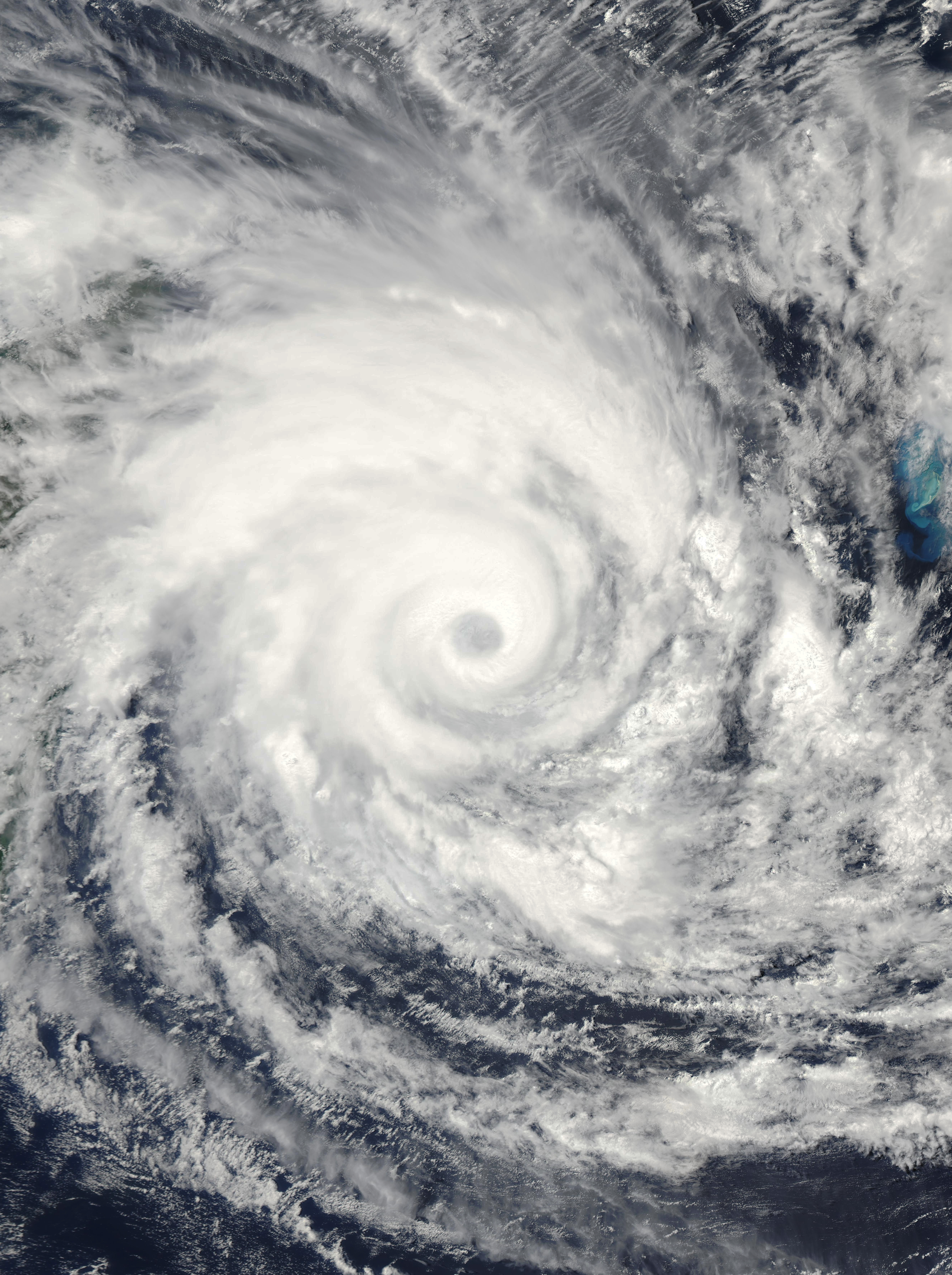
- Cyclone Gamede near peak intensity on February 25

Meteorological history
- Formed: February 20, 2007
- Extratropical: March 2, 2007
- Dissipated: March 6, 2007

Intense tropical cyclone
- 10-minute sustained (MF)
- Highest winds: 165 km/h (105 mph)
- Highest gusts: 230 km/h (145 mph)
- Lowest pressure: 935 hPa (mbar); 27.61 inHg

Category 3-equivalent tropical cyclone
- 1-minute sustained (SSHWS/JTWC)
- Highest winds: 195 km/h (120 mph)
- Lowest pressure: 944 hPa (mbar); 27.88 inHg

Overall effects
- Fatalities: 4 direct
- Damage: $120 million
- Areas affected: Mascarene Islands
- IBTrACS
- Part of the 2006–07 South-West Indian Ocean cyclone season

Intense Tropical Cyclone Gamede was among the wettest tropical cyclones on record, dropping more than 5.5 m (18 ft) of rain in a nine-day period on Réunion island in the southwest Indian Ocean. The seventh named storm of the 2006–07 South-West Indian Ocean cyclone season, Gamede (Note: The name Gamede was submitted to the World Meteorological Organization by South Africa to be used for the sequential naming list for the cyclone season.) formed south of Diego Garcia on February 19 as a tropical disturbance. It tracked generally westward and steadily intensified, reaching tropical cyclone status on February 23. For two days, Gamede stalled northwest of the Mascarene Islands as an intense tropical cyclone, during which it reached 10 minute maximum sustained winds of winds of 165 km/h (105 mph), according to the Météo-France meteorological office in Réunion (MFR). (Note: Météo-France's meteorological office in Réunion (MFR) is the official Regional Specialized Meteorological Center for the South-West Indian Ocean, tracking all tropical cyclones south of the equator, from the east coast of Africa to 90° E.) The American-based Joint Typhoon Warning Center (JTWC) (Note: The Joint Typhoon Warning Center is a joint United States Navy – United States Air Force task force that issues tropical cyclone warnings for the Indian Ocean and other regions.) estimated peak 1 minute winds of 195 km/h (120 mph), equivalent to a Category 3 on the Saffir–Simpson scale. For four days, Gamede remained within 400 km (250 mi) of Réunion before accelerating southward. On March 2, Gamede transitioned into an extratropical cyclone to the southeast of Madagascar. The MFR tracked the storm for four more days.

Cyclone Gamede first passed near St. Brandon, where its 160 km/h (100 mph) wind gusts damaged a few windows. When the storm stalled for a few days, it resulted in a prolonged period of heavy rainfall and high tides for the Mascarene Islands. A pluviometer at Commerson Crater recorded worldwide record rainfall amounts over a period of 3–9 days, with a total of 5,512 mm (217.0 in). Only Cyclone Hyacinthe in 1980 had a higher recorded rainfall total. The deluge from Gamede caused flooding damage across Réunion, washing out a bridge in the southern portion of the island. Monetary damage on Réunion was estimated at over €165 million (US$120 million). (Note: All damage totals are in 2007 versions of their respective currencies.) Two people each were killed on Réunion and nearby Mauritius. The storm's outer rainbands affected southeastern Madagascar, becoming the fourth tropical cyclone to affect the country in two months. Later, high waves from Gamede flooded coastal portions of the South African province of KwaZulu-Natal.

== Meteorological history ==
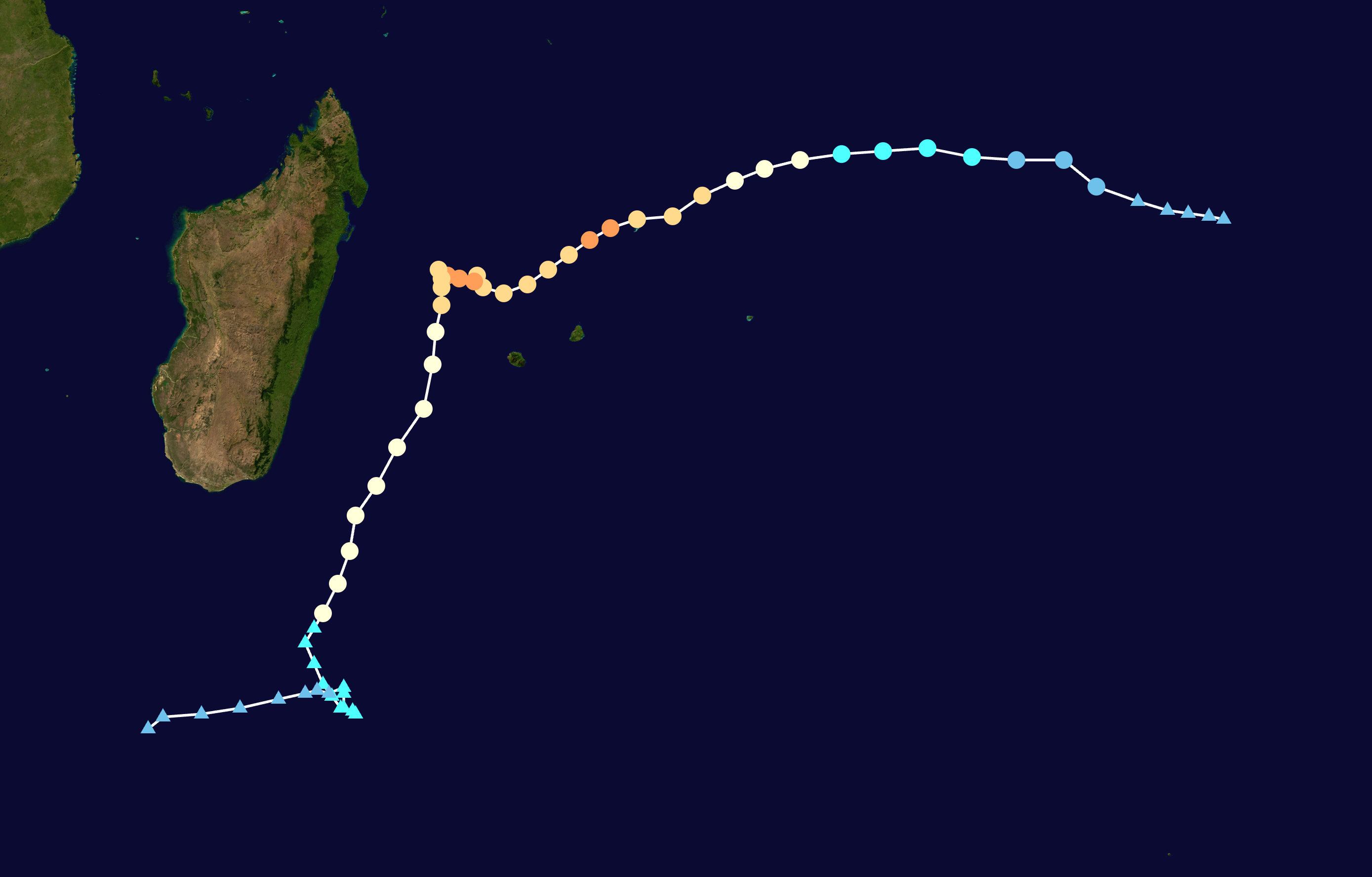
Map plotting the storm's track and intensity, according to the Saffir–Simpson scale Map key Saffir–Simpson scale Tropical depression (≤38 mph, ≤62 km/h) Tropical storm (39–73 mph, 63–118 km/h) Category 1 (74–95 mph, 119–153 km/h) Category 2 (96–110 mph, 154–177 km/h) Category 3 (111–129 mph, 178–208 km/h) Category 4 (130–156 mph, 209–251 km/h) Category 5 (≥157 mph, ≥252 km/h) Unknown Storm type Tropical cyclone Subtropical cyclone Extratropical cyclone, remnant low, tropical disturbance, or monsoon depression

The Intertropical Convergence Zone was active across the Indian Ocean in the middle of February 2007, which spawned a low-pressure area southeast of Diego Garcia on February 18. The system developed convection, or thunderstorms, over a weak, but well-defined low-level circulation. The MFR first began tracking the system as a tropical disturbance on February 19. An anticyclone over the nascent system provided weak wind shear and outflow to the north and east, both favorable conditions for development. With a subtropical ridge to its south, the disturbance tracked generally westward for the first few days of its duration. By late on February 20, the system had organized enough for the MFR to upgrade the disturbance to a tropical depression, and for the JTWC to issue a Tropical Cyclone Formation Alert. On the next day, the MFR upgraded the depression to Moderate Tropical Storm Gamede, and the JTWC began issuing advisories on the storm as Tropical Cyclone 15S. At that time, the storm was located about 785 km (488 mi) south-southwest of Diego Garcia, or about 995 km (618 mi) northeast of Rodrigues.

As Gamede continued to intensify, its track shifted to the west-southwest. On February 22, the MFR upgraded the system to a severe tropical storm, and the JTWC upgraded Gamede to the equivalent of a minimal hurricane. An eye became evident on satellite imagery, a sign of the storm's development. The MFR upgraded Gamede to tropical cyclone status on February 23, noting that the system was "very broad". Soon after, the cyclone moved over St. Brandon, one of the Outer Islands of Mauritius; the island recorded a minimum barometric pressure of 955 mbar (28.2 inHg), and estimated the eyewall diameter at 50 km (31 mi). On February 24, Gamede passed north of Mauritius and Réunion, approaching within 300 km (190 mi) of the latter island. The storm later slowed and stalled, trapped between the subtropical ridge to the south and a ridge to its northeast. For over 90 hours, the cyclone remained within 400 km (250 mi) of Réunion, resulting in torrential rainfall in the island's mountainous region. During this time, Gamede executed a small loop, and the cyclone attained its peak intensity. The MFR estimated peak 10 minute winds of 165 km/h (105 mph) late on February 25. At the same time, the JTWC estimated peak 1 minute winds of 195 km/h (120 mph).

While remaining nearly stationary northwest of the Mascarene Islands, Gamede lost some of its deep convection due to upwelling, the process in which a stationary storm causes the water temperatures to decrease by bringing the cooler, deeper waters to the surface. Early forecasts suggested the possibility that the cyclone would turn westward and strike Madagascar near Toamasina. Instead, a passing trough steered the system to the south-southwest. On February 27, Gamede passed west of Réunion, about halfway between the island and Madagascar. On the next day, the convection near the eye increased slightly. This trend was temporary, as cooler waters and stronger wind shear began affecting Gamede on March 1, leaving the center exposed from the convection. That day, the MFR downgraded Gamede to a severe tropical storm. On March 2, the JTWC discontinued advisories, and the MFR reclassified the storm as an extratropical cyclone. A ridge to its south caused the remnants of Gamede to slow again and execute a small loop southeast of Madagascar. The MFR discontinued advisories on March 4, and the agency tracked the weakening low for two more days at it drifted westward.

== Preparations ==
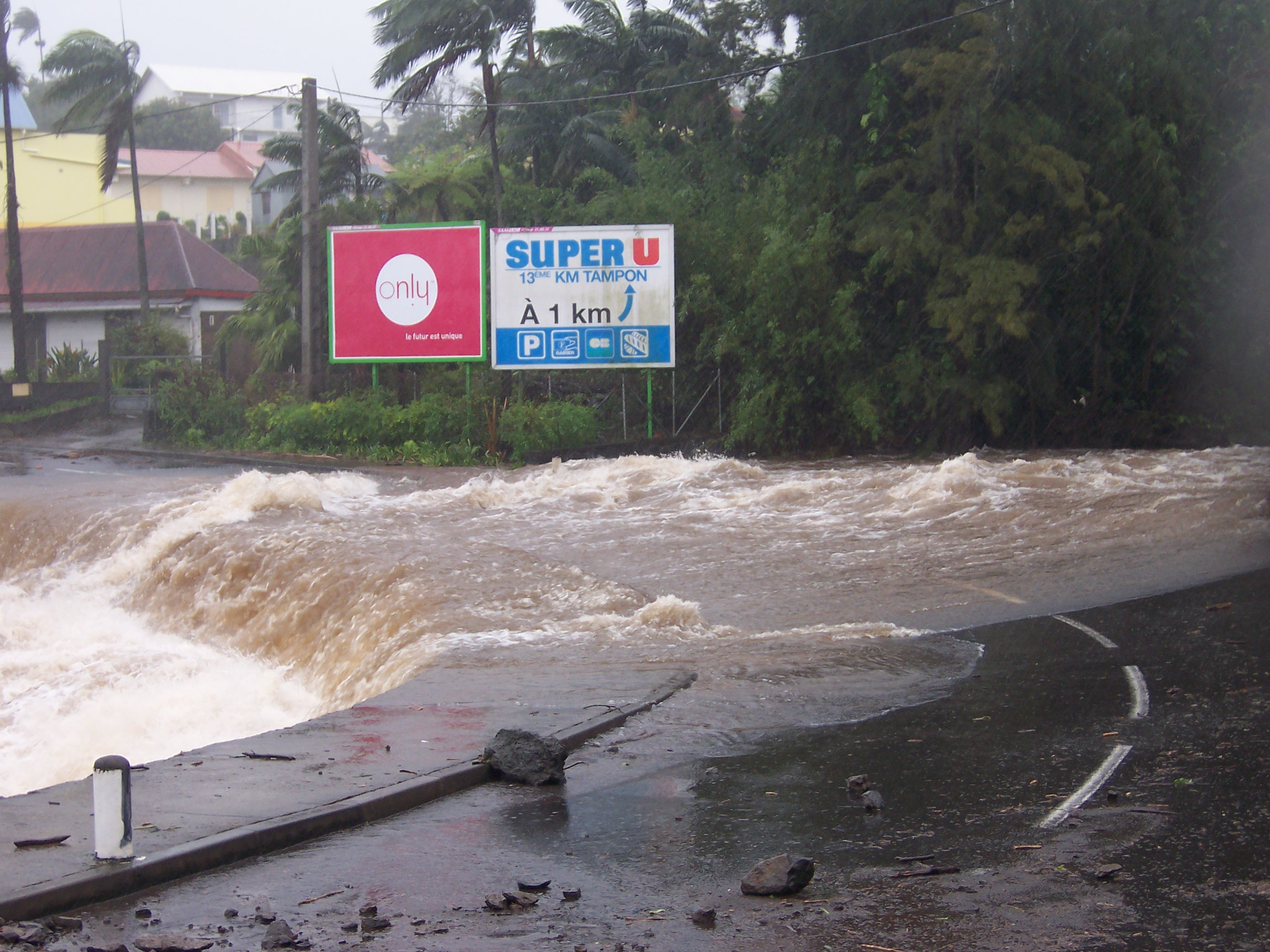
Flooding from Gamede on Réunion

On St. Brandon, the meteorological staff on the island rode out the storm in the Coast Guard office. In Mauritius, a total of 200 people evacuated to storm shelters due to the cyclone. The Mauritius Meteorological Service issued various tropical cyclone warnings for 66 hours, ultimately raising it to a Class IV warning for 6 hours, the highest warning in which gusts of 120 km/h were recorded and expected to continue.

Officials in Réunion closed schools and also issued a temporary driving ban. Due to the threat of the storm, several flights in and out of Mauritius, Réunion, and Rodrigues were canceled. Fishermen were banned from sailing out to sea.

== Impact ==
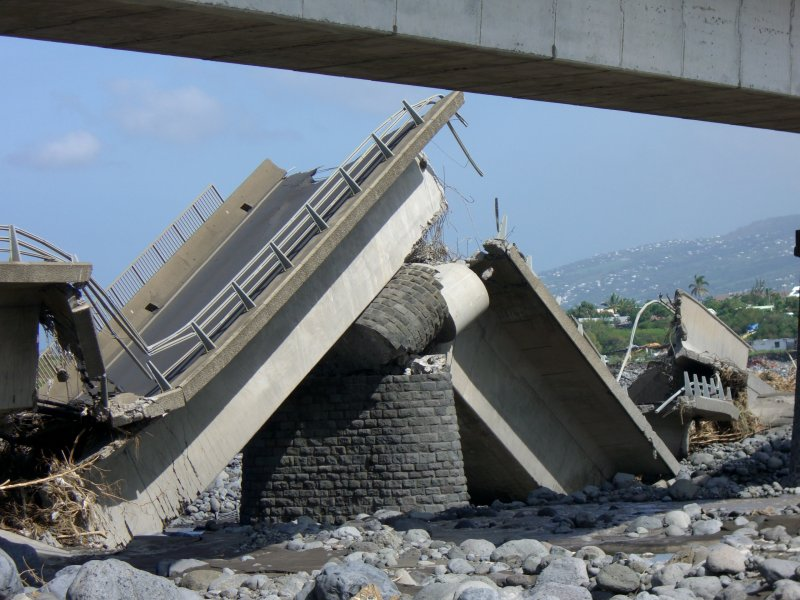
The broken bridge on the Saint-Étienne river after Gamede

With its large circulation, Cyclone Gamede's rainbands affected islands in the south-west Indian Ocean for several days. The storm first affected St. Brandon, where its high tides caused severe beach erosion. The cyclone produced wind gusts of over 160 km/h (100 mph), strong enough to damage window panes and part of an anemometer. Rainfall on the island reached 208 mm (8.2 in). Gamede passed south of Agaléga, dropping 99 mm (3.9 in) of rainfall over a four-day period. The storm's rainfall reached 71 mm (2.8 in) on Rodrigues.

Rough waves and strong winds affected a cruise ship to the east of Madagascar; several windows were broken, though no serious injuries were reported. Gamede lashed Madagascar's east coast with squalls of heavy rainfall and gusty winds, affecting areas struck by Tropical Storm Clovis two months earlier. Gamede had followed shortly after Tropical Cyclones Bondo, Clovis, and Favio, being the fourth tropical cyclone to impact Madagascar in two months. High waves also struck the South African province of KwaZulu-Natal, forcing the temporary closure of beaches, roads, and the Port of Durban.

=== Mauritius ===
Remaining near the Mascarene Islands for several days, Gamede dropped heavy rainfall on Mauritius, reaching 464 mm (18.3 in). Winds on the island reached 158 km/h (98 mph) at Fort Williams in Port Louis.

Gamede killed two on Mauritius, one of whom drowned in high waves. The storm damaged crops and infrastructure, with power knocked out to 70% of the island's population. Despite warnings to remain inside, several people ventured outside during the storm.

=== Réunion ===
The large size of the cyclone resulted in several days of very heavy, continuous rainfall in the mountainous region on Réunion island. The heaviest totals occurred from February 24 through February 28, with a nine-day total of 5,512 mm (217.0 in) at Commerson Crater. Several locations on the island reported great totals. In a 24‑hour period, Hell-Bourg reported 1,489 mm (58.6 in), and in a 72-hour period, Cilaos reported 2,321 mm (91.4 in). A peak wind gust of 205 km/h (125 mph) was reported on the island. Gamede produced the highest waves along the north and west coast of Réunion in 50 years, with a maximum wave heights of 11.7 m (38 ft) at Pointe du Gouffre. The prolonged high waves eroded beaches and washed away the promenade at Le Port.

Monetary damage on Réunion from Gamede was at least €165 million (US$120 million). Two people died on the island after attempting to cross rivers during the storm. At least 90 people were injured due to the storm, including two who were seriously injured. The passage of the cyclone left about 100,000 homes without power or water on Réunion. High floodwaters damaged a dyke along the north bank of the Rivière des Galets. Gamede caused heavy crop damage, including to the sugar cane and banana crops. Several roads and bridges were damaged on the island. Floods damaged roads in Saint-André and Salazie, and washed out a 520 m (1,710 ft) bridge over the Saint Etienne River, part of Route nationale 1 connecting Saint-Louis and Saint-Pierre. The bridge outage left the two towns temporarily isolated.

== Aftermath and records ==
Comparison of previous world record and rainfall from Cyclone Gamede on Réunion Bold indicates current world record
Duration (hours)	Storm name and year	Record prior to Gamede		Gamede total		+/- (in mm)
Duration (hours)	Storm name and year	mm	in	mm	in	+/- (in mm)
24	Denise (1966)	**1825**	**71.8**	1625	64.0	-200
48	Unnamed (1958)	2467	97.1	2463	97.0	-4
72	Hyacinthe (1980)	3240	127.6	**3929**	**154.6**	+689
96	Hyacinthe (1980)	3551	139.8	**4869**	**191.7**	+1318
Total	Hyacinthe (1980)	**5678**	**223.5**	5512	217.0	-166

On June 13, 2007, the government of France provided a relief fund to Réunion of €17.6 million (2007 EUR) in aid, including €9.6 million for farmers affected by the cyclone. The assistance provided €7.7 million for repairing roads and infrastructure, including rebuilding the destroyed bridge over the Saint Etienne River. In the immediate aftermath of the storm, officials deployed army resources to establish a temporary aerial bridge while a new bridge was built. The replacement bridge was opened in June 2013.

Réunion island is the location for several tropical cyclone rainfall records; due to the orography of the island, tropical moisture will travel upward to the volcanic peaks, where it cools and codifies into rainfall. Commerson Crater, located at an elevation of 2.3 km (1.4 mi), recorded historic rainfall accumulations during the passage of Gamede. The location reported 2,463 mm (97.0 in) in 48 hours, which is just short of the worldwide record set by an unnamed tropical cyclone in April 1958. Over 72 hours, Commerson Crater recorded 3,929 mm (154.7 in), which surpassed the previous worldwide record for that duration, set by Cyclone Hyacinthe in 1980. The station also broke rainfall records for precipitation totals between four and nine days, with a storm total of 5,512 mm (217.0 in) in Commerson Crater. Hyacinthe in 1980 dropped 6,083 mm (239.5 in) over 14 days, also at Commerson Crater.

== See also ==
- List of wettest tropical cyclones
- List of wettest tropical cyclones by country
- Tropical cyclones in the Mascarene Islands
- Cyclone Dina
