= 2014 New Year Honours =

Awards of British honours

The New Year Honours 2014 were appointments by some of the 16 Commonwealth realms to various orders and honours to recognise and reward good works by citizens of those countries. The New Year Honours are awarded as part of the New Year celebrations at the start of January.

New Year Honours were announced on 31 December 2013 in the United Kingdom of Great Britain and Northern Ireland. These New Year Honours 2014 were the first New Year Honours in which more women than men were chosen for the Honours.

The recipients of honours are displayed as they were styled before their new honour and arranged by the country (in order of precedence) whose ministers advised The Queen on the appointments, then by honour with grades i.e. Knight/Dame Grand Cross, Knight/Dame Commander etc. and then divisions i.e. Civil, Diplomatic and Military as appropriate.

== United Kingdom ==
Below are the individuals appointed by Elizabeth II in her right as Queen of the United Kingdom with honours within her own gift and with the advice of the Government for other honours.

=== Knight of the Most Ancient and Most Noble Order of the Thistle (KT) ===
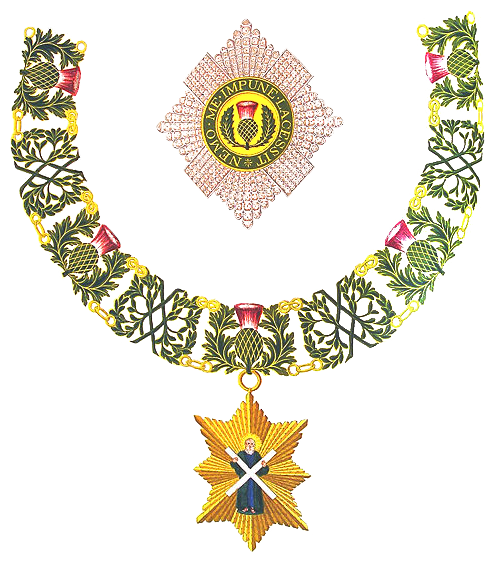
The star and collar of the Order of the Thistle

- The Right Honourable David Alexander Cospatrick Douglas-Home, Earl of Home, CVO, CBE.
- The Right Honourable Robert Haldane Smith, Baron Smith of Kelvin.

=== Member of the Order of Merit (OM) ===
- Sir Simon Rattle CBE
- Professor Martin West FBA
- Sir Magdi Yacoub FRS

=== Member of the Order of the Companions of Honour (CH) ===
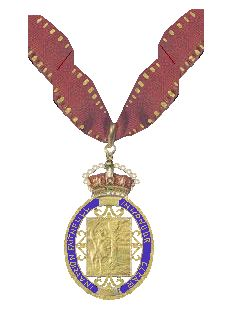
The riband and badge of a Member of the Order of the Companions of Honour

- Sir Peter Maxwell Davies CBE – For services to Music.
- The Right Honourable The Baroness O'Neill of Bengarve CBE FBA – For services to Philosophy and Public Policy.

=== Knight Bachelor ===
- The Right Honourable Kevin Barron MP. For political and public service.
- Professor Adrian Peter Bird CBE FRS FRSE. For services to Science.
- Professor Richard William Blundell CBE FBA. For services to Economics and Social Science.
- Ian Michael Cheshire. For services to Business, Sustainability and the Environment.
- Michael Victor Codron CBE. For services to the Theatre.
- Paul Collier CBE. For services to Promoting Research and Policy Change in Africa.
- David Nigel Dalton. For services to Healthcare.
- Roger Michael De Haan CBE DL. For services to Education and to charity in Kent and Overseas.
- Michael Roger Gifford. For services to International Business, Culture and the City of London.
- Antony Mark David Gormley OBE. For services to the Arts.
- Michael Griffiths. For services to Education.
- Peter James Luff MP. For political and public service.
- Dr Noel Robert Malcolm FBA. For services to Scholarship, Journalism and European History.
- The Right Honourable Richard Geoffrey James Ottaway MP. For parliamentary and political service.
- Professor Godfrey Henry Oliver Palmer OBE. For services to Human Rights, Science and charity.
- Alan Parker. For services to Business, Charitable Giving and Philanthropy in the UK.
- Professor Peter John Ratcliffe FRS. For services to Clinical Medicine.
- Julian Roger Seymour CBE. For public service.
- Paul Tucker. For services to Central Banking.
- Craig Tunstall. For services to Education.
- Michael Wilkins. For services to Education.
- Mark Worthington. For public service.

Diplomatic Service and Overseas List

- Professor Michael Edwards OBE. For services to UK/French cultural relations.

=== The Most Honourable Order of the Bath ===
==== Knights / Dames Commander of the Order of the Bath (KCB / DCB) ====
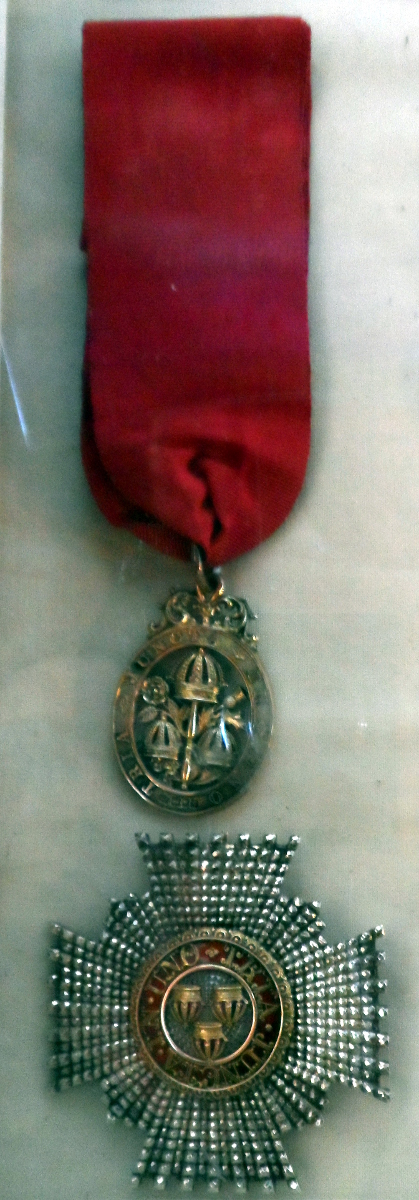
Badge of a Knight Commander of the Civil Division of the Order of the Bath

Military Division

- Lieutenant General David Capewell OBE
- Lieutenant General Nick Carter CBE DSO – Late The Royal Green Jackets
- Air Marshal Stephen Hillier CBE DFC

Civil Division

- The Right Honourable Sir Christopher Geidt KCVO OBE, For public service
- Derek William Jones CB, For public service especially to economic and social conditions in Wales
- Keir Starmer QC, For services to Law and Criminal Justice

==== Companion of the Order of the Bath (CB) ====
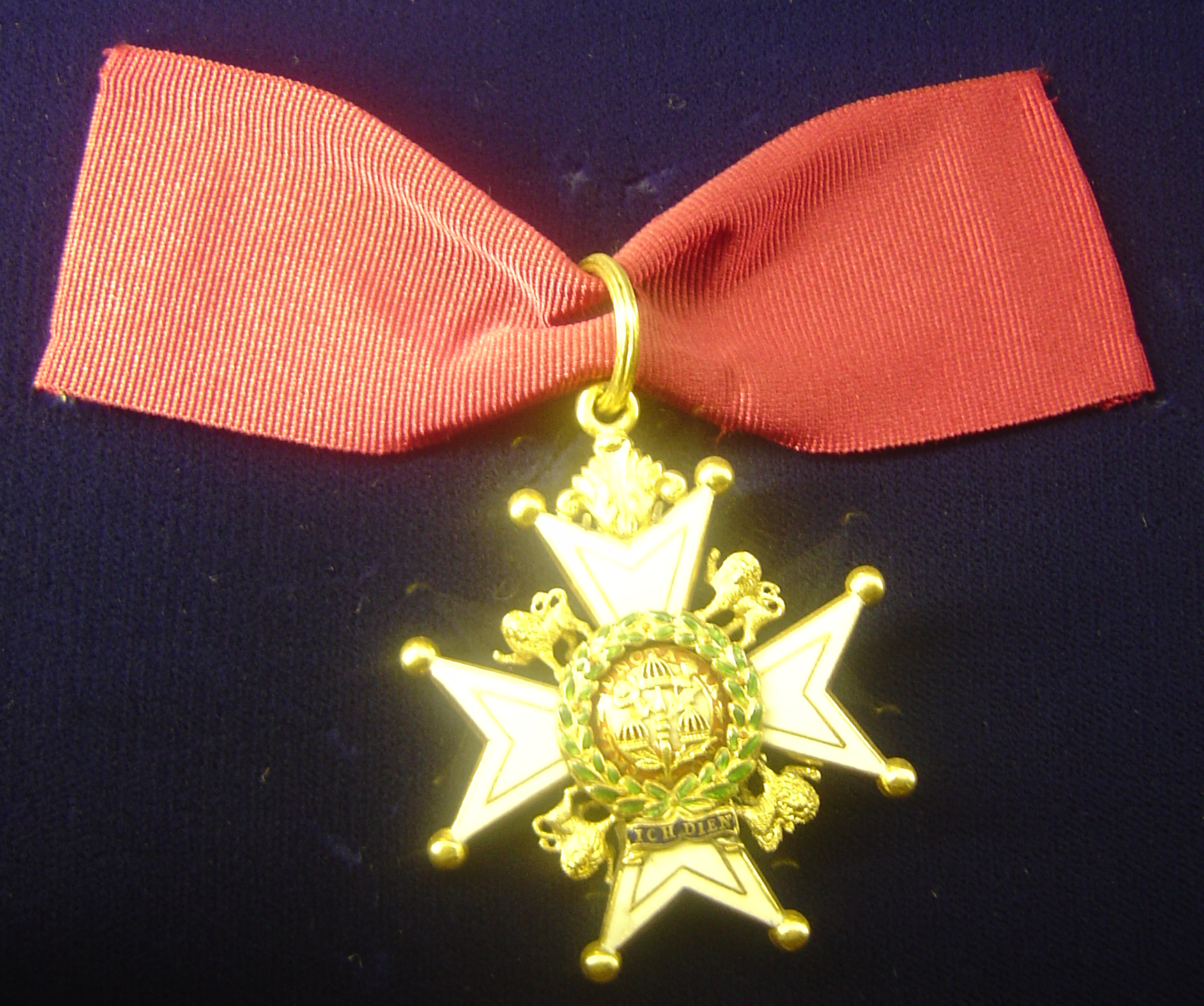
Badge of a Companion of the Military Division of the Order of the Bath

Military Division

Royal Navy

- Rear Admiral John Howard James Gower OBE
- Rear Admiral Matthew John Parr

Army

- Major General John McNiven Ross Henderson – Late Corps of Royal Electrical and Mechanical Engineers
- Major General Carew Lovell Wilks CBE – Late Corps of Royal Engineers

Royal Air Force

- Air Vice-Marshal Lindsay John Irvine
- Air Vice-Marshal Ross Paterson OBE

Civil Division

- Michael Anderson, For services to International Development
- Michael Charles Lancaster Carpenter, For services to Parliament and voluntary service to the community in Surrey
- William Crothers, For services to Government Efficiency and Commercial Capability
- Michael James Ellam, For services to International Finance Policy
- Dr Derek William Feeley, For services to Healthcare
- Bruce Fiddes Houlder QC DL, For services to Defence, particularly Armed Forces Justice
- John James Pullinger, For services to Parliament and voluntary service to the community through Great Culverden Park Ltd
- Stephen John Rimmer, For services to Criminal Justice and Policing Reform
- Dr Philip John Rycroft, For services to the UK's Devolved and Coalition Governments

=== The Most Distinguished Order of Saint Michael and Saint George ===
==== Knights / Dames Commander of the Order of St Michael and St George (KCMG / DCMG) ====
- Martin Stuart Davidson CMG, chief executive officer, British Council. For services to British cultural, scientific and educational interests worldwide.
- Adam McClure Thomson CMG, High Commissioner, Pakistan. For services to British interests in Pakistan.

==== Companion of the Order of St Michael and St George (CMG) ====
- Laurent Robert Beaudoin, Chairman, Bombardier Inc, Montreal, Canada. For services to British industry, particularly in Northern Ireland.
- Martin Hugh Clements OBE, Director General, Foreign and Commonwealth Office. For services to international diplomacy.
- David (Francis) Kerr Finlay OBE, Chair, American Friends of the British Museum. For services to cultural and educational philanthropy.
- Dr Gregor Irwin, director, Economics and Chief Economist, Foreign and Commonwealth Office. For services to economic analysis in foreign policy.
- Dr Alastair David McPhail OBE, Lately HM Ambassador, South Sudan. For services to British interests in South Sudan.
- Dr Andrew Charles Palmer, Executive Vice-President, Nissan, Japan. For services to the British automotive industry.
- Graham Keith Perolls OBE, Founder and Executive Director, Hospices of Hope. For services to palliative care in Central Europe, particularly Romania.
- Mrs Kathryn Mary Pritchard, director, Foreign and Commonwealth Office. For services to British foreign policy.
- Michael Hardwick Tomalin OBE, Lately Chief Executive, National Bank of Abu Dhabi, UAE. For services to UK/UAE business co-operation and to the British community in Abu Dhabi.
- Robert Leigh Turner, HM Consul General, Istanbul and lately HM Ambassador, Ukraine. For services to British interests in Ukraine and Turkey.

=== The Royal Victorian Order ===
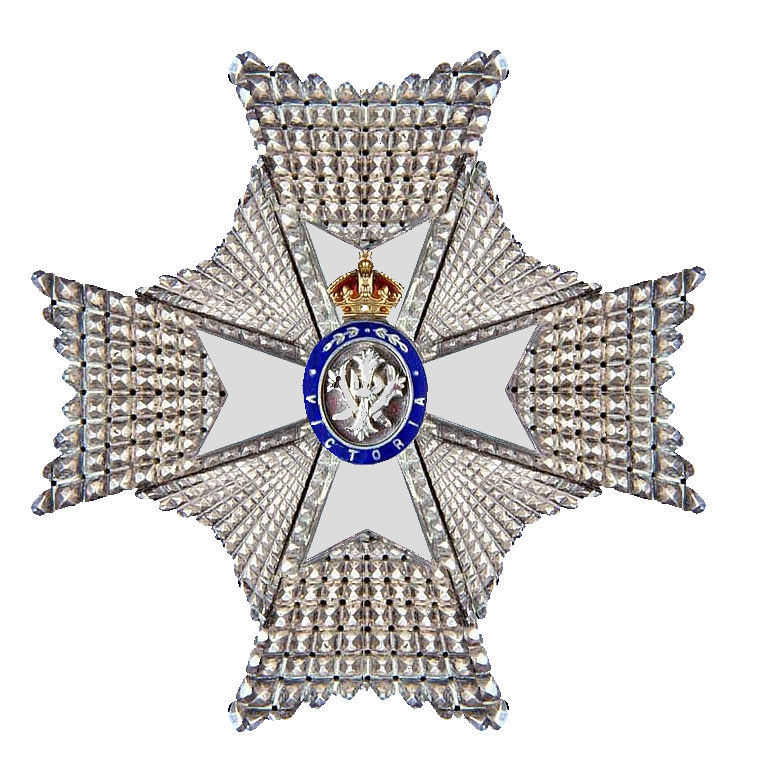
Insignia of a Knight / Dames Commander of the Royal Victorian Order

==== Knights / Dames Commander of the Royal Victorian Order (KCVO / DCVO) ====
- Lady Gass, Lord-Lieutenant of Somerset.
- The Honourable Annabel Alice Hoyer Whitehead CVO – Lady in Waiting to The Queen.
- Algernon Eustace Hugh Heber-Percy – Lord-Lieutenant of Shropshire.
- Marcus Edward Setchell CVO – Surgeon-Gynaecologist, Royal Household.

==== Commander of the Royal Victorian Order (CVO) ====
- Nicholas John Lucas Chance LVO JP – Private secretary to Prince Michael of Kent
- His Honour Gruffydd Huw Morgan Daniel – Lord Lieutenant of Gwynedd
- Edward Charles Griffiths LVO – Deputy Master of the Household
- Jennifer Susan Gordon Lennox LVO – Lady in Waiting to The Queen
- Michael John Paul Marks, CBE – Trustee, The Queen's Trust and The Prince's Trust
- Phillippe Patrick O'Shea CNZM LVO – New Zealand Herald of Arms Extraordinary
- Mark Ian Price – Chairman, l and The Prince's Countryside Fund
- Valerie Lane-Fox Pitt-Rivers – Lord Lieutenant of Dorset
- David Ian Scott – Formerly Trustee, The Duke of Edinburgh's Award
- Hugh Richard Seaborn – Formerly Member of Council, Duchy of Lancaster

==== Lieutenant of the Royal Victorian Order (LVO) ====
- Craig Bruce Andrew – Formerly Executive director, The Duke of Edinburgh's International Award
- Chief Inspector John Derek Askew MVO, Metropolitan Police – For services to Royalty Protection
- Caroline Ann Cassels MVO – Matron, King Edward VII's Hospital, Sister Agnes
- Robin Simon Conibear – Development manager, Poundbury, Duchy of Cornwall.
- Diane Angela Duke DL – Private secretary and Comptroller to Princess Alexandra, the Honourable Lady Ogilvy
- Annabelle Mary Galletley MVO – Assistant private secretary to The Earl and Countess of Wessex, and Lady in Waiting to The Countess of Wessex
- Inspector Iain MacRae MVO, Metropolitan Police – For services to Royalty Protection
- Peter Stephen Neumark – Formerly Deputy chairman, Outward Bound Trust
- David Charles Wheeler MVO – Senior Furniture Conservator, Royal Collection Trust
- Captain Richard Martin Woodman – Formerly Corporate Board, Trinity House

===== Honorary Lieutenant of the Royal Victorian Order =====
- Wendy Yvonne Nomathemba Luhabe – Formerly Trustee, The Duke of Edinburgh's International Award Foundation

==== Member of the Royal Victorian Order (MVO) ====
- David Barber – The Queen's Swan Marker
- Sandra Bull – Correspondence Officer, Royal Household
- Mark Edward Fisher – Head of Ticketing and Sales, Royal Collection Trust
- Victoria Lucy Harris – Director, Business in the Community and The Prince's Rural Action Programme
- Heather Corinne Hatherly – Administrative assistant, Palace of Holyroodhouse
- Amanda Jane Holdforth RVM – Housekeeper, Royal Lodge
- Gemma Catherine Teresa Kaza – Inventory Controller, Household of The Prince of Wales and The Duchess of Cornwall
- Kevin David Lomas RVM – House manager, Highgrove House
- Garry Keith Marsden – Visitor manager, Balmoral Castle
- Inspector Ian William Reid – For services to Royalty Protection in Scotland
- Debra Louise Searle MBE – Formerly Trustee, The Duke of Edinburgh's Award
- William David Hamilton Sellar – Lord Lyon King of Arms and secretary of the Order of the Thistle
- Inspector Andrew Neil Stapleton, Metropolitan Police – For services to Royalty Protection
- Alexander Milne Taylor RVM – Formerly Foreman, Balmoral Estate
- Paul James Webb – For property services to the Royal Household
- David Weigh RVM – Chief Cabinet Maker, Royal Household
- Joanne Elizabeth Wilson – Senior Anniversaries Officer, Royal Household
- Martin David Woods RVM – Head Gardener, Sandringham Estate.

=== Royal Victorian Medal ===
- Elinor Mary Allan – General assistant, Housekeeping, Palace of Holyroodhouse
- James Anthony Butler – Stationery and Reprographics Officer, Royal Household
- Divisional Sergeant Major Graham James Dear MBE – The Queen's Body Guard of the Yeomen of the Guard
- Ian Robert Garnett – Gardens Team Supervisor, Crown Estate, Windsor
- Robert James McGee – Carpenter, Crown Estate, Windsor
- Stephen Joseph Towers – Chauffeur to The Duke of Kent
- Shona Kay Williams – Assistant Dresser to The Duchess of Cornwall
- Robert Large – Yeoman of the Royal Cellars, Royal Household

=== The Most Excellent Order of the British Empire ===
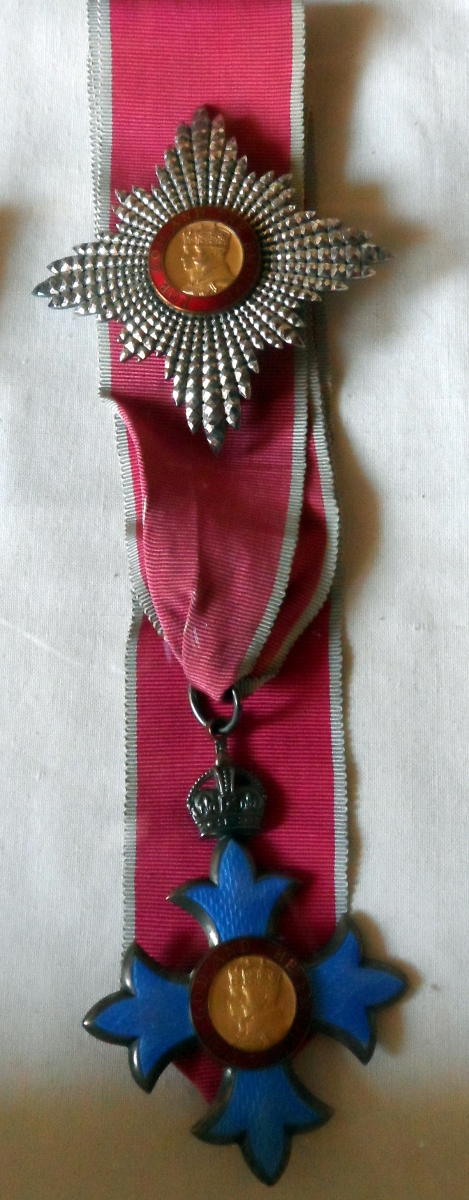
Insignia of a Knight Commander of the Order of the British Empire

==== Dame Commander of the Order of the British Empire (DBE) ====
Civil Division

- Kathryn August, lately Executive Director of Education, The Education Fellowship and lately Principal, Manchester Academy. For services to Education.
- Professor Susan Mary Bailey, OBE, President, Royal College of Psychiatrists. For services to Psychiatry and for voluntary service to People with Mental Health Conditions.
- Dr Mary Colette Bowe, Chair, Ofcom. For services to Media and Communications.
- Rosemary Janet Mair Butler AM, Presiding Officer, National Assembly for Wales. For political and public services particularly to Women.
- Alison Jane Carnwath, Chairman, Land Securities. For services to Business.
- Professor Celia Mary Hoyles OBE, lately Director, National Centre for Excellence in Teaching Mathematics. For services to Education.
- Penelope Anne Constance Keith CBE DL. For services to the Arts and to Charity.
- Asha Khemka, OBE, Principal and Chief Executive, West Nottinghamshire College. For services to Further Education.
- Professor Frances Clare Kirwan FRS, Professor of Mathematics, University of Oxford. For services to Mathematics.
- Angela Brigid Lansbury CBE. For services to drama and to charitable work and philanthropy.
- Gillian Barbara Lynne CBE, Choreographer. For services to Dance and Musical Theatre.
- Alison Margaret Peacock, Headteacher, Wroxham Primary School, Hertfordshire. For services to Education.
- Professor Shirley Anne Pearce CBE. For services to Higher Education.
- Seona Elizabeth Reid CBE, lately Director, Glasgow School of Art. For services to the Creative Industries.
- Professor Pamela Jean Shaw, Professor of Neurology, Sheffield. For services to Neuroscience, particularly through the Sheffield Institute for Translational Neuroscience.
- Professor Julia Mary Slingo. OBE, Chief Scientist, Meteorological Office. For services to Weather and Climate Science.
- Rachel Mary De Souza, lately Executive Principal, Ormiston Victory Academy, Norwich, Norfolk. For services to Education.

==== Knight Commander of the Order of the British Empire (KBE) ====
Civil Division

- Timothy Charles Clark, President, Emirates Airline, Dubai, UAE. For services to British prosperity and to the Aviation Industry.

==== Commander of the Order of the British Empire (CBE) ====
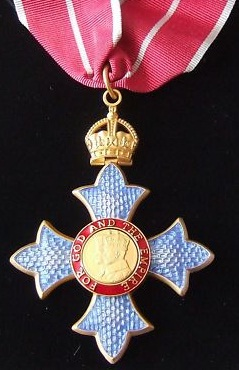
Neck badge of a Commander of the Military Division of the Order of the British Empire

Military Division

- The Reverend Scott James Brown QHC
- Rear Admiral Christopher John Hockley
- Commodore Richard Charles Thompson
- Colonel Nicholas Seymour Chapman MBE, Late The Mercian Regiment
- Major General Nicholas Henry Eeles, Late Royal Regiment of Artillery
- Brigadier Samuel Piercy Evans OBE, Late The Royal Logistic Corps, Army Reserve
- Colonel Fiona Helen Gardner, Late The Royal Logistic Corps
- Brigadier Robert Malcolm Bowstead Nitsch MBE, Late Corps of Royal Electrical and Mechanical Engineers
- Group Captain Christina Reid Elliot
- Air Commodore Stuart Charles Evans
- Group Captain Ian Steven Pollitt MBE
- Group Captain Steven Roger Thornber

Civil Division

- Professor Ash Amin, FBA, Professor of Geography, University of Cambridge. For services to Social Science.
- Nigel Charles Annett, Managing Director, Welsh Water. For services to the Water Industry in Wales and voluntary service to Wateraid.
- John Dorrington Apthorp, OBE, Philanthropist. For charitable services particularly in Hertfordshire.
- Jane Rachel Ashcroft, Chief Executive, Anchor Trust. For services to Older People.
- Professor Helen Valerie Atkinson, Chair, Metals Processing and Head, Department of Engineering, University of Leicester. For services to Engineering and Education.
- Claire Elizabeth Axten, Headteacher, Brookside Community Primary School, Somerset. For services to Education.
- Julie Dawn Bailey, Campaigner, Cure the NHS, Staffordshire. For services to the Care of Older People.
- Jayne Banner, Deputy Director, Local Compliance, Nottingham, H.M. Revenue and Customs. For services to Public Reform Efficiencies.
- Dr Janet Barnes, Chief Executive, York Museums Trust. For services to Museums in Yorkshire.
- Professor Stuart Bartholomew, Principal and Vice Chancellor, Arts University Bournemouth. For services to Higher Education.
- David Alan Bernstein, lately Chair, Football Association. For services to Football.
- Dr Astrid Elizabeth Bonfield. For services to the charitable sector in the UK and Abroad.
- Susan Bott, Director, Disability Rights UK. For services to People with Disabilities and their Families.
- Pamela Bowen, Senior Policy Adviser, Crown Prosecution Service. For services to Law and Order, particularly for Human Trafficking Criminal Prosecution Policy.
- Michael Bracken, Executive Director, Government Digital Service. For services to Digital Public Services and voluntary service in the London Borough of Hackney.
- Karren Brady, Vice Chair, West Ham Football Club. For services to Entrepreneurship and Women in Business.
- Victoria Harriet Lucy, Viscountess Bridgeman, FRSA, Founder, Bridgeman Arts Library and the Artists' Collecting Society. For services to Art.
- Michael John Mary Brophy. For services to the voluntary sector in the UK.
- Robert Edward Brown. For political service.
- Mandie Jane Campbell, Chief Operating Officer, UK Border Force, Home Office. For public service.
- Professor Doreen Cantrell, FRS, FRSE, Vice-Principal and Head of College, Life Sciences, University of Dundee. For services to Life Sciences.
- Councillor Paul Benedict Crossland Carter, Leader, Kent County Council. For services to Local Government.
- Rita Ann Clifton. For services to the Advertising Industry.
- Philip Collins, Chairman, Office of Fair Trading. For services to the Competition and Consumer Protection Regime.
- Dominic Cooke, Theatre Director. For services to Drama.
- John Michael Harold Copley, Opera Director. For services to Opera.
- Donna Mary Covey. For services to Equalities and Human Rights.
- Katherine Lucy Garrett-Cox, Chief Executive, Alliance Trust. For services to the Asset Management Industry and charitable service through the Baring Foundation.
- Michael Patrick Crawford, OBE. For charitable and philanthropic services, particularly to Children's Charities.
- Professor Anthony Derek Howell Crook, Emeritus Professor, University of Sheffield, Chair Shelter, and Deputy Chair, Orbit Housing Group. For services to Housing and Charitable Governance.
- Professor Marian Ellina Dawkins Professor, Animal Behaviour, University of Oxford. For services to Animal Welfare.
- Barry John Dodd, OBE, Chairman, GSM Group. For services to the Yorkshire Economy and voluntary service to the community.
- Richard Dorment, Chief Art Critic, Daily Telegraph. For services to the Arts.
- Dr Jane Elizabeth Doughty, lately Director, Design and Development, Leadership Division, National College for Teaching and Leadership. For services to Education.
- Matthew Dunkley, Director of Children's Services, East Sussex County Council. For services to Children, Young People and Families.
- David Warren Arthur East, lately Chief Executive, ARM Holdings. For services to the Technology Industry.
- Haydn Evans, Headteacher, Sir John Cass Foundation and Redcoat Church of England Secondary School, Tower Hamlets, London. For services to Education.
- Richard Eyre, Chairman, Internet Advertising Bureau. For services to Advertising and the Media.
- Margaret Farrar, lately Strategic Director for Leadership Development, National College for Teaching and Leadership. For services to Education
- Anthony Owen Benedict Finn, lately Chief Executive, General Teaching Council for Scotland. For services to Education.
- Benjamin Arthur Foot, MBE, Country Director, Somalia and Somaliland, Save the Children. For services to Disadvantaged and Vulnerable Children Worldwide.
- Philippa Lucy Foster Back, OBE, Chair, UK Antarctic Place-Names Committee and lately Chair, UK Antarctic Heritage Trust. For services to Antarctic heritage.
- Professor Alastair David Shaw Fowler, FBA, Emeritus Professor of Rhetoric and English Literature, University of Edinburgh. For services to Literature and Education.
- Jayne-Anne Gadhia, Chief Executive Officer, Virgin Money. For services to Banking and voluntary service to the community.
- Professor Olivier James Garden, Regius Chair of Clinical Surgery, University of Edinburgh. For services to Surgery.
- Professor Catherine Anne Gerrish, Professor of Nursing, University of Sheffield and Sheffield Teaching Hospitals NHS Foundation Trust. For services to Nursing.
- Professor Carole Anne Goble, Professor, Computer Science, University of Manchester. For services to Science.
- Professor Van Jonathan Gore, Vice-Chancellor, Southampton Solent University. For services to Higher Education.
- Iain Gilmour Gray, Chief Executive Officer, Technology Strategy Board. For services to Science, Technology and Innovation.
- Keith Griffiths, Chief Executive, Rhondda Cynon Taff County Borough Council. For services to Local Government in Wales.
- Lynda Caroline Hamlyn, Chief Executive, NHS Blood and Transplant. For services to Healthcare.
- Gillian Hammond, Deputy Director, Estates and Support Services, Nottingham, H.M. Revenue and Customs. For services to Civil Service Management and Reform.
- Peter Kendal Hargreaves, Co-founder, Hargreaves Lansdown. For services to Business Innovation, Financial Services and to the City of Bristol.
- James Trevor Haslett, Chief Executive Officer, NI Water. For services to the Water Industry in Northern Ireland and voluntary service to the community.
- John Raymond Hirst, Chief Executive, Meteorological Office. For services to Meteorology.
- Cressida Mary Hogg, (Mrs Legge) Managing Partner, 3i. For services to Infrastructure Investment and Policy.
- David Charles Holmes, lately Chief Executive, British Association for Adoption and Fostering. For services to Children and Families.
- Stephen Hough, Pianist. For services to Music.
- Beverly Hurley, Chief Executive, YTKO. For services to Enterprise.
- Dr Kenneth Robin Jackson Chief Executive and Secretary, The British Academy. For services to Scholarship.
- Adrianne Shirley Jones, MBE. For services to Tennis.
- Peter Bennett-Jones. For services to the Entertainment Industry and to charity, particularly through Comic Relief.
- Professor John Anderson Kay, FRSE, FBA. For services to Economics.
- Professor Douglas Bruce Kell, lately Chief Executive, Biotechnology and Biological Sciences Research Council. For services to Science and Research.
- Rosemary Ann Kempsell, Worldwide President, Mothers' Union. For services to Family Life in the UK and Abroad.
- Dr Paula Marie Vasco-Knight, Chief Executive, South Devon Healthcare NHS Foundation Trust. For services to the NHS.
- Rear Admiral Richard John Lippiett, CB, MBE, Chief Executive, The Mary Rose Trust. For services to British Heritage.
- Professor Peter Wilson MacFarlane FRS, FRSE, Emeritus Professor, Institute of Cardiovascular and Medical Sciences, University of Glasgow. For services to Healthcare.
- Christopher John Mairs, Chief Scientist, Metaswitch Networks. For services to Engineering.
- Professor Harvey McGregor QC. For services to the Law and Education.
- Jeffrey Thomas Robert Mitchell, lately Head of Common Law Claims and Policy, Ministry of Defence. For services to Defence.
- Lucy Scott-Moncrieff, lately President, the Law Society. For services to Legal Aid.
- Professor Patrick John Morrison, Honorary Professor of Human Genetics, Queen's University, Belfast. For services to Healthcare in Northern Ireland.
- Professor David Bradley Morton, Veterinarian. For services to the UK and International Veterinary Profession especially Animal Welfare and Ethics.
- Kristina Murrin, lately Appointments Secretary and Director, Personnel and Performance Unit, Prime Minister's Office. For services to the Prime Minister's Office.
- Professor David Edgar Neal, Professor of Surgical Oncology, University of Cambridge. For services to Surgery.
- Deborah Clare Ounsted. (Mrs Walker-Arnott) For services to the Charitable Sector in the UK.
- Professor Richard Parish, lately Chief Executive, Royal Society for Public Health. For services to Public Health.
- Roger George Parry. For services to Media and the Arts particularly the Globe Theatre, London.
- Charles Nicholas Parsons, OBE. For charitable services, particularly to Children's Charities.
- Mary Elizabeth Pattison, Head of Division, Ageing Society and State Pensions, Strategy Group, Department for Work and Pensions. For services to State Pension Reform.
- Trevor William Pearce, QPM, lately Director General, Serious and Organised Crime Agency. For services to Law Enforcement.
- Emma Samantha Pidding, Chairman, National Conservative Convention. For voluntary political service.
- Carlos Yunior Acosta Quesada, Ballet Dancer. For services to Ballet.
- Dr Keith William Ridge, Chief Pharmaceutical Officer, Department of Health. For services to the Pharmacy Profession and to Patients.
- Professor Stephen Basil Cuthbert Scott, Director, National Academy for Parenting Research. For services to Families.
- Paul David Skinner, Chairman, Infrastructure UK. For services to Business and Infrastructure.
- Dr James Michael Smith, Chief Executive Officer, The Aegis Trust. For services to Holocaust Education and Genocide Prevention.
- John Edward Kitson Smith, lately Chair, Student Loans Company and Pro-Chancellor and Chair, University of Birmingham. For services to Higher Education.
- Louise Hazel Patricia Smith, lately Executive Headteacher, Ingrow and Long Lee Primary Schools Federation, Bradford. For services to Education.
- Clive Kenneth Stephens, Deputy Director, Large Business Service, Bristol, H.M. Revenue and Customs. For services to Tax Compliance for Large Businesses.
- Roy Alexander Stone, Principal Private Secretary, Government Chief Whip's Office. For parliamentary and public service.
- Edward Sweeney, lately Chair, ACAS. For services to Employment Relations.
- Stefan Paul Allesch-Taylor. For philanthropic and charitable services in the UK and Africa.
- William George Turkington, Head of Office, Pakistan, Department for International Development. For services to International. Development and Humanitarian Assistance in Pakistan.
- Robert Andrew Voss, Chief Executive Officer, Voss International. For services to British Industry and for voluntary service in the UK.
- David Gogo Waboso, Director, Capital Programmes, London Underground. For services to Transport in London.
- David White, Head of Fraud Investigation Service, DWP Operations. For services to the Department for Work and Pensions.
- Elaine White, Headteacher, St. Mary and St. Thomas Aquinas Catholic Primary School, Gateshead. For services to Education and voluntary service to People with Disabilities.
- Katharine Elizabeth Whitehorn Journalist. For services to Journalism.
- Jonathan Staines Whitfield, Director, Internal Audit Department, Department for Business, Innovation and Skills. For services to Government Audit.
- Anne Ursula Willcocks, Director, Insolvency Service. For services to the Development of Market Frameworks and Leadership of Major Parliamentary Bills.
- Professor John Gordon Williams, Professor of Health Services Research, Swansea University. For services to Medicine.
- Nicholas Paul Winser, Executive Director, UK National Grid. For services to the UK Energy Industry.
- Professor Lesley Jane Yellowlees, MBE, FRSE, President, Royal Society of Chemistry. For services to Chemistry.

==== Officer of the Order of the British Empire (OBE) ====
Military Division

- Commodore Martin John Atherton
- Colonel Giles Harry Lund Baxter
- Lieutenant Colonel Alan Billings
- Lieutenant Colonel John Boyd
- Wing Commander Philip Alan Brooker
- Commander Adrian Conleth Burns
- Lieutenant Colonel Richard John Cantrill MC
- Lieutenant Colonel Jeremy Paul Cook
- Commander Iain Cull
- Colonel Duncan Andrew Dewar
- Wing Commander Richard Ian Langley
- Lieutenant Colonel William Robertson Lindsay
- Group Captain Allan Paul Marshall
- Colonel Victor Joseph Garth Matthews
- Lieutenant Colonel George Alexander Maund
- Colonel Andrew Macfarlane Mills
- Wing Commander John Finbar Monahan DFC
- Wing Commander Roger Lee Morgan
- Colonel Rupert William Robson
- Group Captain Simon John Spence
- Lieutenant Colonel Niall McKerrow Stokoe

Civil Division

- Mrs Elaine Cynthia Acaster. Formerly vice-Principal for Strategy and Governance, Royal Veterinary College University of London. For services to Higher Education.
- Mahmood Ahmed. Chair, Birmingham City Labour Party. For voluntary political service.
- Mrs Susan Jane Alford. Headteacher, Dunkirk Primary School, Dunkirk, Nottingham. For services to Education.
- Nicholas Allott. For services to Theatre and Charity.
- Craig Anderson. Chief executive, Furniture Re-Use Network. For services to the Voluntary Sector in the UK.
- Kenneth Albert Applebee. Member, Council of the Institute for Animal Technology. For services to Animal Technician Education and Animal Technology.
- Zeev Aram. Furniture Designer. For services to Design and Architecture.
- Mrs Sylvia Jean Auton. Formerly chief executive and chairman, IPC Media. For services to the Publishing Industry.
- Mrs Gill Harjagbir Bal. Headteacher, Wembley High Technology College, London Borough of Brent. For services to Education.
- Mrs Marilyn Janita Baldwin. Volunteer, Metropolitan Police Service and Founder, Think Jessica Campaign. For services to Families and Victims of Mass Marketing Fraud.
- Professor Susan Ellen Bale. Assistant Nurse director, Research and Development, Aneurin Bevan Local Health Board. For services to Nursing and Nursing Research.
- Andrew Alfred Banks. Managing director, Pentland Ferries. For services to Transport and the community in Orkney.
- Ms Cynthia Margaret Barlow. Chair, RoadPeace UK. For services to Road Safety.
- Dr Jane Margaret Barrett. President, Royal College of Radiologists. For services to Radiology.
- Ms Tara Bartley. National Nursing Representative, Society for Cardiothoracic Surgery. For services to Nursing.
- Andrew John Basford. Principal Officer, manager Engineering Development, Serious and Organised Crime Agency. For services to Law Enforcement.
- Shahed Ahmed Battiwala. Headteacher, Elmhurst Primary School, Newham. For services to Education.
- Andrew Baxendine. Ministry of Defence. For services to Defence.
- Mrs Janet Adelaide Baxter. For voluntary service Overseas and in the North of Scotland.
- Robert Truman Baxter. For voluntary service Overseas and in the North of Scotland.
- David Colin Bedford. For services to Athletics and charitable fundraising.
- Mrs Pamela Elaine Bell. Philanthropist. For charitable services in the UK and Jersey.
- Miss Lynda Bellingham. For voluntary service to Charitable Giving in the UK.
- John Michael Biggin. Director, HM Prison and Young Offenders Institute, Doncaster. For services to Offender Management and Rehabilitation.
- Mrs Margaret Boden. Chief executive, Christian Aid Ireland. For services to International Development.
- Michael John Bonehill. For charitable services, particularly to the National Youth Theatre.
- Professor Nigel Leslie Brown, FRSE. President, Society for General Microbiology and Emeritus Professor of Molecular Microbiology, University of Edinburgh. For services to Science.
- Richard John Buckley. Co-director, University of Leicester Archaeological Service. For services to Archaeology.
- Mrs Ann Cadman. Director, The Source Skills Academy. For services to the community in South Yorkshire.
- Professor Paul Stephen Cannon. Formerly director, Poynting Institute, Qinetiq and University of Birmingham. For services to Engineering.
- Professor Linda Dolores Cardozo. Consultant Gynaecologist, King's College Hospital, London. For services to Urogynaecology and Women's Health.
- Ms Julia Frances Wasteneys Carrick. Global Ambassador, Walpole. For services to the British Luxury Goods Industry.
- Ms Colette Carroll. Deputy director, Rail Group Development, Department for Transport. For services to the Rail Industry.
- Frank Albert Carter. For services to Business, charity and to the community in Barnsley, South Yorkshire.
- Ms Jennifer Cheyne. For services to Hairdressing and charity.
- Dr Fiona Kennedy Clark, DL. For services to Music and for charitable services in Scotland.
- Mrs Lindsey Jean Clark. Executive Principal, Park View School, The Academy of Mathematics and Science, Birmingham. For services to Education.
- Robin Clark. Philanthropist. For charitable services through The Underwood Trust.
- Professor Juliet Elizabeth Compston. Emeritus Professor of Bone Medicine, Department of Medicine, University of Cambridge. For services to the Treatment of Osteoporosis.
- Bernard Cook. Formerly chairman, The Royal British Legion Poppy Factory. For services to Ex-Servicemen and Women.
- Ms Cornelia Ellen Cooling. Headteacher, Bousfield Primary School, London. For services to Education.
- Christopher John Corbin. Restaurateur. For services to the Hospitality Industry and voluntary services through Leuka.
- Christopher Charles Corbould. Special Effects Supervisor. For services to Film.
- Mrs Catherine Mary Court. Co-founder, Netmums.com. For services to Families.
- Mrs Kathrine Helen Cowell, DL. For services to the community in Cheshire and Greater Manchester.
- Martin Stevens Coyd. For services to Rugby League.
- Mark Vallance Crabtree. Managing director, AMS Neve. For services to Advanced Manufacturing and Creative Industries.
- Professor David Cracknell. Director of Teaching and Learning, University of Chester Academies Trust, University of Chester, Cheshire. For services to Education.
- Mrs Sarah Louise Creighton. Executive Principal of The Hill, Gooseacre and Littleworth Grange Primary Academies, South Yorkshire. For services to Education.
- Mrs Shirley-Anne Crosbie. Headteacher, The Chiltern School, Caddington, Bedfordshire. For services to Children with Special Needs Education.
- Richard Crossley. For services to Neighbourhoods and Social Housing Tenants.
- Paul Geoffrey Crowther. Deputy chief Constable, British Transport Police. For services to Policing.
- Mrs Alison Cunningham. Group manager for Debt Contact Centres, Debt Management, Department for Work and Pensions. For services to Debt Management and to the community in North Yorkshire.
- Mrs Sally Davies. Headteacher, Thriftwood Special School, Chelmsford. For services to Special Needs Education.
- Geraint Talfan Davies, DL. For services to Culture, Broadcasting and to charity.
- Mrs Caroline Mary Davis. Chief executive, Families for Children. For services to Children and Families in South West England.
- Mrs Ruth Carolyn Dearnley. Chief executive Officer, Stop The Traffik. For services to Awareness and Prevention of Human Trafficking.
- Mrs Lucy Margaret Dennett. For services to Volunteering in the UK.
- John Victor Doggart. Founder, SEA, and co-Founder, ECD. For services to Sustainable Energy Technologies and Energy Efficiency.
- Mrs Helene Donnelly. Nurse Practitioner and Ambassador, Staffordshire and Stoke-on-Trent Partnership Trust. For services to the NHS.
- Mrs Judith Holder Donnelly. Headteacher, Pennywell Early Years Centre, Sunderland. For services to Children.
- Christopher Thomas Dovey. National chairman, Royal Naval Association. For voluntary service to Naval Personnel and the community in Worcestershire.
- Bryan Drew, QPM. Formerly director, UK Football Policing Unit, Home Office. For services to Policing in Sport.
- Edwin Alexander Dunlop. For services to the community in North Down, Northern Ireland.
- Mrs Sarah Beatrice Dunning. Chief executive, Tebay Services. For services to the Food, Drink and Hospitality Sectors.
- David Elworthy. Superintendent, Thames Valley Police. For services to Protective Security.
- Cynthia, (Hyacinth), Mrs. Eubanks, Executive Headteacher, Grinling Gibbons and Lucas Vale Primary Schools, Lewisham. For services to Education.
- Miss Sarah Hauldys Evans. Formerly Headteacher, King Edward VI High School for Girls, Birmingham and Chair, Independent Schools' Teacher Induction Panel. For services to Education.
- Paul Michael Fallon. Independent Chair, Croydon Safeguarding Children Board and Trustee, Crime Reduction Initiatives. For services to Child Protection.
- John Arthur Fassenfelt, JP. Formerly chairman, Magistrates' Association. For services to the Administration of Justice and the community.
- Nicholas Robert Febbrarro. Grade 7, Ministry of Defence. For services to the Royal Navy.
- Dr Margaret Du Feu. For services to Deaf People in Northern Ireland.
- Stephen Christopher Firn. Chief executive, Oxleas NHS Foundation Trust. For services to Healthcare particularly Mental Health.
- Jonathan Neil Fitzmaurice. Director, Self Help Housing. For services to Housing.
- Dr Amelia Fletcher. Formerly chief Economist, Office of Fair Trading. For services to Competition and Consumer Economics.
- Dr Nicholas Christopher Fox. Director, International Wildlife Consultants UK. For services to Falconry and the Conservation of Raptors.
- Mrs Siobhan Freegard. Co-founder, Netmums.com. For services to Families.
- Paul Dominic Giannasi. Lead, Cross-Government Hate Crime Programme. For services to Policing, Equality and Human Rights.
- Mrs Alison Mary Gilchrist, DL. For services to Business and to the community in Renfrewshire.
- Carl Vincent Gilleard. Formerly chief executive, Association of Graduate Recruiters. For services to Higher Education and Graduate Employability.
- Mrs Christine Goldstraw, JP. Chair, Nottinghamshire Probation Trust. For services to Probation and Criminal Justice.
- Mrs Susan Mary Good. For services to Fairtrade and Education.
- Roland John Gooding. Headteacher, Valence School, Westerham, Kent. For services to Education.
- Lenox Valentine Green. For services to the community through the Rainbow Christian Centre in Hulme, Greater Manchester.
- Paul Anthony Griffiths. For services to Music Literature and Composition.
- Imam Asim Hafiz. Religious Adviser and Imam, HM Armed Forces. For services to Defence, especially in support of Afghan Operations.
- William James Halliday. Chief executive, Mindwise. For services to People with Disabilities and Mental Health Conditions in Northern Ireland.
- Dr Rose Mary Harley. For services to International Aid and charity.
- Iain Christopher Harrison. Ministry of Defence. For services to Defence.
- Jonathan Nigel Vigurs Harvey. Co-Founder, Acme Studios. For services to the Arts.
- Richard John Harwood, QC. For services to Planning and Environment Law Decision-making.
- Ms Erica Jane Hewison. Founding Partner, Bolton and Quinn. For services to the Arts.
- Mrs Lynette Joy Hirst. Head of Enforcement and Specialist Offices, Debt Management and Banking, Birmingham, H.M Revenue and Customs. For service to Taxpayers.
- Lady Patricia Marina Hobson, MBE. For services to Ballet and Philanthropy.
- Mrs Carol Kristina Holden. Chief executive, Northwest Automotive Alliance. For services to the Automotive Industry in the North West.
- Anthony Horowitz. Author and Screenwriter. For services to Literature.
- Mrs Andrea Lee Hough. Managing director, AT Engine Control. For services to Manufacturing.
- Mrs Eithne Theresa Hughes. Headteacher, Bryn Elian High School, Conwy. For services to Secondary Education in Wales.
- Ms Janet Elizabeth Hull. Director of Marketing and Executive director, Creative Pioneers' Challenge, Institute of Practitioners in Advertising. For services to the Creative Industries.
- Ms Gillian Leah Humphreys. Founder and Artistic director, The Concordia Foundation. For services to Music.
- Mrs Jane Elizabeth Humphreys. Head of Spectrum Policy, Department for Culture, Media and Sport. For services to UK Mobile Communications.
- Miss Jane Elizabeth Hunt. Member, Disabled Customers consultant Group, HM Revenue and Customs. For services to Taxpayers with Disabilities.
- David Huse. For services to the Voluntary and Community Sector in the UK.
- Mrs Sofina Aktar Motin Islam. Headteacher, Stanton Bridge Primary School, Coventry. For services to Education.
- Stephen Andrew Jack. Chairman, Independent Living Fund. For services to disabled people.
- Allan Oliver Jagger. For services to Training and Education of Young People through Kirdale Industrial Training Services and to charity in West Yorkshire.
- Miss Katherine Jenkins. Singer. For services to Music and for charitable services.
- Ms Aideen Jones. Formerly chief executive, Southdown Housing Association. For services to People with Intellectual Disabilities.
- James Edward Jones. Head, Firearms and Explosives Licensing Unit, Greater Manchester Police. For services to Policing.
- Lyndon Ivor Jones, MBE. Chair, The Noah's Ark Appeal. For voluntary services to the Children's Hospital in Wales.
- Peter Emerson Jones. Chairman, Emerson Group. For services to Business in the North West.
- Mrs Ruth Jones. Researcher and consultant, Department of Applied Social Sciences, University of Worcester. For services to Victims of Domestic and Sexual Violence.
- Miss Lindsay Allason-Jones. Archaeologist. For services to Archaeology.
- Graham Michael Jukes. Chief executive, Chartered Institute of Environmental Health. For services to Environmental Health in the UK and Abroad.
- Ms Joyce Enid Keller. Councillor, Manchester City Council. For political service to the community in Manchester.
- Owen Dennis Kelly. Chief executive, Scottish Financial Enterprise. For Financial and Charitable service in Scotland.
- Mrs Maire Fionnuala Kerr. Head, Higher Education Division, Department for Employment and Learning, Northern Ireland Executive. For services to Social and Economic Development in Northern Ireland.
- Jeremy King. Restaurateur. For services to the Hospitality Industry and voluntary service to the Arts.
- Martin Peter Knops. Formerly Counsellor, Oxfam. For services to Oxfam.
- Professor James Rex Knowlson. Emeritus Professor of French, University of Reading. For services to Literary Scholarship.
- Miss Priya Lakhani. Entrepreneur. For services to Business, community and Voluntary Initiatives.
- Nicholas Lewis. Formerly Regional director, United States of America, Serious Organised Crime Agency. For services to International Law and Order.
- Simon David Lewis. For public service and services to International Education through the Fulbright Commission.
- Ms Bridget Lindley. Deputy chief executive and Principal Legal Adviser, Family Rights Group. For services to Families.
- Geoffrey Peter Little. Deputy chief executive, Manchester City Council. For services to Local Government.
- Professor Sonia Livingstone. Professor, Department of Media and Communications, London School of Economics. For services to Children and Child Internet Safety.
- Edward John Lloyd. Chairman, Edward Lloyd Trust. For services to Young People with Intellectual Disabilities.
- Dr Ernest Fergus Logan. Managing director, Giltspur Scientific Ltd. For services to Agriculture in Northern Ireland.
- John David Longden. Founder, Pub is The Hub. For voluntary services to Rural Communities in the UK.
- Steven Leslie Lowthian. Head of Operations, Washington, Tyne and Wear, HM Revenue and Customs. For services to Child Benefit Reform and voluntary service to Children's Football in Durham.
- Councillor Evelyn Ann Lucas. Member, Local Government Association's Safer and Stronger Communities Board. For services to Local Government.
- Lady Claire MacDonald. For services to the Hospitality Industry and to charity in Scotland particularly through Marie Curie Cancer Care.
- Mrs Mary MacIntyre. Director, Strategic Planning, Department of Environment, Northern Ireland Executive. For services to Planning and voluntary service to Strabane District Caring.
- Ms Amanda Felicity Mackenzie. Chief Marketing and Communications Officer
- Ms Shona Beattie Malcolm. Disability Athletics Development Officer. For services to Athletics.
- Muhammad Khawar Amin Mann. Founding Member and Chair, Mosaic. For voluntary and charitable service.
- Mrs Sandra Manning. Business Unit head, Local Compliance, London, HM Revenue and Customs. For services to Tax Compliance and voluntary service to the community.
- Charles Lewis Matthews. Formerly chairman, Axeon and Non-Executive chairman and Founder, Sigma Quality Consultancy. For services to Technology and Innovation.
- Mrs Pauline Christina McCabe. Formerly Prisoner Ombudsman for Northern Ireland. For services to Prisoners' Welfare.
- Professor Mary Kathrine McColgan. Professor of Social Work, University of Ulster. For services to the Social Care Sector in Northern Ireland.
- Dr Joseph Oswald McHugh. Head, Radioactive Substances Regulation, Environment Agency. For services to Radioactive Substances Regulation and voluntary service to the community.
- Nigel McIlwaine. For voluntary service to the Reserve Forces and Cadets Association and the community in Northern Ireland.
- Robert John McLean. board member, Dungannon Development Association. For service to the Economy and Regeneration of Dungannon and Donaghmore, Northern Ireland.
- Ian Egginton-Metters. Assistant chief executive, Federation of City Farms and Community Gardens. For services to the City Farms Movement.
- Geoffrey Miller. National Selector, England Cricket Team. For services to Cricket.
- Mrs Sara Mogel. Formerly Principal, West Cheshire College. For services to Vocational Education.
- William Howard Clive Montgomery. For services to the community in Northern Ireland.
- Mrs Catherine Lorna Moran, MBE. Chief executive, Northern Recruitment Group. For services to Enterprise Promotion.
- Douglas Downie Morrison. Formerly Port director. Associated British Ports. For services to the Ports Industry.
- Trevor Simon Robert Mort. Chairman, Conservative Party Disciplinary Committee. For voluntary political service.
- Dr Hamid Ghafoor Mughal. Director, Global Manufacturing, Rolls-Royce plc. For services to Technology, Innovation and Manufacturing.
- Mrs Rafaat Mughal. Founder and director, JAN Trust. For services to Disadvantaged Women and the community in Haringey.
- Franklyn Keith Musto. Founder, Musto Clothing. For services to the Economy.
- Gordon Macpherson Nicolson. Leader, Eden District Council. For services to Local Government.
- Ms Pamela Margaret Niven. Implementation manager, Organ Donation Task Force, NHS Lothian. For services to Healthcare and Organ Donation in Scotland.
- Maj David Allister John Noble, DL. Board chairman, Poppyscotland. For voluntary service to Ex-Servicemen and Women in Scotland.
- Ms Susan Anne O'Brien. chief executive Officer, Norman Broadbent. For services to Gender Equality in the Workplace and voluntary service to the community.
- Charles Keith Oliver. Chair, Cricket Scotland. For services to Cricket.
- Dennis Overton. Chairman, Aquascot. For services to the Economy in Alness and Rwanda.
- Peter Lothar Owen. Founder, Peter Owen Publishers. For services to Literature.
- David Renault Panton. Co-Founder, Acme Studios. For services to the Arts.
- Michael John Parker. For services to Public Transport and voluntary services in the North East of England.
- Professor Jennifer Joy Pearce. Professor of Young People and Public Policy, University of Bedfordshire. For services to Vulnerable Children and Young People.
- Mrs Candice Patricia Pellett. District Nurse, Lincolnshire Community Health Services NHS Trust. For services to Nursing.
- Ms Maxine Penlington. Formerly chief Operating Officer, Birmingham City University. For services to Higher Education.
- Ms Phoebe Philo. Creative director, Celine. For services to Fashion.
- Hugo Rudolph Pike. For charitable services in the UK and Abroad through the Rotary Club and Worldwaterworks Ltd.
- Ms Elzbieta Wanda Piotrowska. Principal, Morley College, London. For services to Further and Adult Education.
- Mr Myles Power. For services to charity.
- Mrs Penny Power. Founder, Ecademy. For services to Entrepreneurship in Social and Digital Development.
- Terence Joseph Prendergast. Formerly chief executive, Marriage Care. For services to Families.
- Dr Graeme Alexander Stewart Purves. Formerly assistant chief Planner, Scottish Government. For services to the Planning Profession.
- Ms Jane Elizabeth Quinn. Founding Partner, Bolton and Quinn. For services to the Arts.
- Professor Abhay Rane. Consultant Urological Surgeon, East Surrey Hospital, Redhill, Surrey. For services to Laparoscopy Surgery.
- Philip George Rescorla. Formerly Team Leader, Working Age Benefits, Strategy, Department for Work and Pensions. For services to Social Security Policy and to the community in London.
- Miss Cathrine Margaret Richardson. Formerly Principal, Lakes College, West Cumbria. For services to Further Education.
- Neil Allan Richardson, QPM. Deputy chief Constable, Police Scotland. For services to Policing in Scotland.
- Terrence Anthony Riley. Chief executive, British Sign Language Broadcasting Trust and Chair, British Deaf Association. For services to Broadcasting and Deaf People.
- Professor Mary Alice Ritter. Chief executive Officer, Climate-KIC. For services to Scientific Research and Innovation.
- Dr Anne Elizabeth Kerslake Roberts. Associate Professor and Senior Lecturer in Occupational Therapy, University of Plymouth. For services to Occupational Therapy.
- Ms Ceridwen Mary Roberts. Senior Research Fellow, Department of Social Policy and Intervention, University of Oxford. For services to Social Science.
- Robert Bruce Beecroft Ropner. Vice-president, British Bobsleigh. For services to Bobsleigh, particularly Youth Training.
- Richard Alan Rose. Formerly A2L, Private Sector Development and National Infrastructure Team, Department for International Development. For services to Infrastructure in Afghanistan.
- Professor Elizabeth Mary Rouse. Formerly head, London College of Communication and Deputy Rector, University of the Arts, London. For services to Higher Education.
- Mrs Doreen Rowland. Occupational Therapist, Ministry of Defence. For services to Armed Forces Personnel.
- Ms Kathryn Margaret Rudd. Principal, National Star Specialist College. For services to Further Education for Young Adults with Complex Disabilities and Severe Learning Difficulties.
- Mrs Sarah Carolyn Russell. Co-founder, Netmums.com. For services to Families.
- Syon Ivan Sadka. Chair, Derek Williams Trust. For services to the National Museum of Wales and to the Arts in Wales.
- Paul Victor Savage. For services to Maritime and Coastal Safety.
- Mrs Susan Elizabeth Sharpe. Chief executive, Pharmaceutical Services Negotiating Committee. For services to the Pharmaceutical Industry.
- David Lewis Shaw. Head, Regent Street, Portfolio, the Crown Estate. For services to the Retail Industry and voluntary service particularly through the Orpheus Foundation.
- Mrs Ruth Mary Shaw. Honorary Alderman, London Borough of Sutton Council. For political service.
- Mrs Janet Sheard. Formerly Executive director of Nursing and Allied Health Professionals, Nottinghamshire Healthcare NHS Trust. For services to Healthcare.
- Mrs Tasmina Ahmed-Sheikh. For services to Business and to the Asian community in Scotland.
- Mrs Brenda Mary Sheils. Principal, Solihull College. For services to Further Education.
- Ms Joanna Shields. Chief executive, Tech City UK. For services to the Digital Industries and voluntary service to Young People.
- Mrs Pauline Shields. Chief Superintendent, Police Service of Northern Ireland. For services to Policing and the community in Northern Ireland.
- Andrew William Simons. Grade 7, Ministry of Defence. For services to Defence Information Capability.
- Ms Christina Anne Smith. For philanthropic services to Conservation and the Arts.
- Mrs Susan Janet Smith. For services to the Townswomen's Guild.
- Michael Acton Smith. Chief executive and Founder, Mind Candy. For services to the Creative Industries.
- Mrs Sally Hayes-Smith. Founder and Executive director, Action for Kids Charitable Trust. For Services to Children and Young People.
- Ashok Soni. Pharmacist, Croydon and Founding Member, NHS Future Forum, Surrey. For services to Community Pharmacy and the NHS.
- Professor Peter Henri Sonksen. For services to Anti-Doping in Sports.
- David Mark Spofforth. President, Institute of Chartered Accountants in England and Wales. For services to the Accountancy Profession.
- Lady Joanna Susan Elizabeth Staughton, DL, JP. For services to Education, Health, Law and charity in Hertfordshire.
- Anthony William Stewart. Grade 6, Specialist Investigations Technical Team, Solihull, HM Revenue and Customs. For services to Tackling Tax Non-Compliance.
- Mrs Lorraine Roslyn Stobie. Formerly head, Southcraig Campus, South Ayrshire. For services to Children with Special Educational Needs.
- Gerald Arthur Sturtridge. For voluntary services to the community in Devon.
- David Charles Chester Sulkin. For services to the Arts, Education and Charity.
- Paul Stanley Swaddle. For voluntary political service.
- Professor Elizabeth Matilda Tansey. Professor, History of Modern Medicine, Queen Mary University of London. For services to Research in the Medical Sciences and to the Public Understanding of Science.
- Dr Jenifer Fay Alys Tennison. Technical director, Open Data Institute. For services to Technology and Open Data.
- Councillor Alan Huw Thomas, Leader, Neath Port Talbot County Borough Council. For services to Local Government in Wales.
- Ms Susan Jane Tibballs. Formerly chief executive, the Women's Sport and Fitness Foundation. For services to Sport.
- Professor Wendy Belinda Tindale. Scientific director, Sheffield Teaching Hospitals and Clinical director, NIHR Devices for Dignity Healthcare Technology Cooperative. For services to Healthcare.
- Michael Tobin. Chief executive Officer, TelecityGroup. For services to the Digital Economy.
- Dr Daniel Todd. Formerly head, Avian Virology, Veterinary Science Division, Agri-Food and Biosciences Institute. For services to Biological Sciences and Veterinary Work.
- Ms Sandra Birgitte Toksvig. Comedian, Presenter and Author. For services to Broadcasting.
- Ms Loretta Tomasi. Chief executive, English National Opera. For services to Opera.
- Ms Anissa Toscano. Consultant, Department for International Development. For Humanitarian services particularly in Syria.
- Christopher Train. Chair. Energy Emergencies Executive Committee. For services to the Gas and Electricity Industry.
- Mrs Holly Turner. Grade 7, Academies Performance and Brokerage North Division, Department for Education. For services to Education and voluntary service to the Girl Guides in Darlington.
- Mrs Pamela Mary Waldron. Formerly head of Operations, Health and Safety Executive Field Operations, Yorkshire and North East. For services to Health and Safety in the Workplace.
- Mrs Elaine Harrington Warburton. Chief executive Officer, QuantuMDx Group Ltd. For services to Innovation in Healthcare.
- Paul Welch. Head. Records, Information Governance and Departmental Records Officer, Department for Business, Innovation and Skills. For services to Records and Information.
- Paul Barry Fletcher Whitaker. For services to the Textile Industry and to the community in Bradford, West Yorkshire.
- Ms Vanessa Victoria Whitburn. Formerly Editor, The Archers. For services to Radio Drama.
- Dr Catherine White. Clinical director, St. Mary's Sexual Assault Referral Centre, Manchester. For services to Vulnerable People.
- Miss Lindsey Janet Whiterod. Principal and chief executive, South Tyneside College. For services to Further Education.
- Professor Gregory Peter Whyte. For services to Sport, Sport Science and to charity.
- Professor Moira Katherine Brigid Whyte. Professor of Respiratory Medicine, University of Sheffield. For services to Respiratory Medicine.
- Benjamin Wicks. Ministry of Defence. For services to Defence.
- Richard Edward John Wightman, JP. Chair of Corporation, Bradford College. For services to Further Education and voluntary services to the community in Bradford.
- Ms Alison Marjorie Wild. Formerly Chair, Association of Heads of University Administration and Deputy chief executive, Liverpool John Moores University. For services to Higher Education.
- Gareth Wyn Williams. Principal, West Kirby Residential School. For services to Special Needs Education.
- Brian James Wilson. Head of Security, Scottish Parliament. For public service to the Scottish Parliament and voluntary services in Fife.
- Nigel Martin Woof. Chief executive Officer, Map Action. For Humanitarian services.
- Clive Richard Wray. Director of Public Sector Contracts, Business West Ltd. For services to Small Businesses and International Trade.
- Mrs Linda Mary Catherine Wyon. Founder and honorary president, Bath Child Contact Centre. For services to Children and Families.
- Ms Rachel Aba Yankey, MBE. Professional Footballer. For service to Football, particularly the Women's and Youth Games.
- Mrs Fiona Young. Chief executive, Disability Snowsport UK. For services to Disability Sport.

==== Member of the Order of the British Empire (MBE) ====
Military Division

Royal Navy

- Commander Eleanor Louise Ablett
- Colour Sergeant Martin Ash, Royal Marines
- Warrant Officer 1 Logistics (Supply Chain) Anne Baxter
- Warrant Officer 2 (Air Engineering Technician) (Avionics) Barry Innes Firth
- Petty Officer Physical Training Instructor Suzanne Gibson
- Warrant Officer 2 Engineering Technician (Marine Engineering) Paul Hutchinson
- Warrant Officer 2 John Kemp, Royal Marines
- Lieutenant Commander Thomas Michael Knott
- chief petty officerLogistics (Writer) Peter Martin McCarrick
- Warrant Officer 2 Stephen Morris, Royal Marines
- Lieutenant Hugo George Sedgwick, Royal Navy

British Army

- Major Malcolm Peter Birkett, The Yorkshire Regiment
- Sergeant Michael Clark, Adjutant General's Corps (Staff and Personnel Support Branch)
- Major David Andrew Cooper, Royal Army Medical Corps Army Reserve
- Lieutenant Colonel Mark Derek Costen, The Parachute Regiment
- Major Paul Edward Davis, The Royal Logistic Corps
- Major Paul Anthony Eaton, The Royal Logistic Corps
- Warrant Officer Class 2 Brian Anthony Eshelby, Corps of Royal Engineers
- Lieutenant Colonel Roger Charles Derwent Fawcus, Corps of Royal Engineers
- Major Susan Mary Ford, Adjutant General's Corps (Educational and Training Services Branch)
- Major Ronald Albert Goodwin, The Mercian Regiment
- Warrant Officer Class 1 Duncan Hedges, Corps of Royal Electrical and Mechanical Engineers Army Reserve
- Warrant Officer Class 1 Thomas Heron Johnstone, Army Air Corps
- Captain Gerald William Kearse, The Queen's Royal Hussars
- Captain David Lambert, Army Air Corps
- Captain Andrew Layzell, The Princess of Wales's Royal Regiment Army Reserve
- Major Anthony William Maw, Corps of Royal Electrical and Mechanical Engineers
- Major Paul McCarthy, The Royal Welsh
- Warrant Officer Class 1 Craig Pirie, The Royal Regiment of Scotland
- Major Jacqueline Patricia Ridgway Ridley–Jones, Adjutant General's Corps (Educational and Training Services Branch) Army Reserve
- Warrant Officer Class 1 Christopher Seymour, Corps of Royal Engineers
- Major Simon Geoffrey Smith, Corps of Royal Electrical and Mechanical Engineers
- Major Paul Richard Smyth, The Rifles Army Reserve
- Rifleman Michael James Swain, The Rifles
- Major William Hamilton Terrett, TD, 1st (Northern Ireland) Battalion Army Cadet Force
- Lieutenant Colonel Simon Christopher Thomsett, The Princess of Wales's Royal Regiment
- Staff Sergeant Jonathan David Winfield, Intelligence Corps
- Lieutenant Colonel Mark William Wood, Royal Regiment of Artillery
- Lieutenant Colonel Colin Richard Woodley, The Royal Logistic Corps
- Captain Steffan Michael Wright, Corps of Royal Engineers

Royal Air Force

- Squadron Leader Alistair John Allsop
- Wing Commander John Ian Chappell
- Squadron Leader Paul Thomas Hamilton
- Warrant Officer Brian Jeffrey
- Squadron Leader Alasdair Ian Craig Kirk
- Squadron Leader Joanna Madin
- Warrant Officer Barry Anthony McEvoy
- Squadron Leader Christopher Robert Melville
- Squadron Leader Peter Mockeridge, Royal Air Force Volunteer Reserve (Training)
- Warrant Officer David Mark Palfreman
- Flight Lieutenant Philip John Powell
- Flight Lieutenant Walter Dewar Sutherland, Royal Auxiliary Air Force
- Squadron Leader Angela Unsworth

Civil Division

- Zaidah Parveen, Mrs. Ahmed, J.P., Schools Community Engagement and Cohesion Lead, Rotherham Borough Council. For services to the community in Rotherham, South Yorkshire.
- Dr. Diane Edna Ames, Consultant Clinician for Stroke Medicine, Imperial College Healthcare NHS Trust, London. For services to Stroke Medicine.
- Iain David Anderson, Consultant Surgeon, Hope Hospital, Salford. For services to Clinical Surgery and Medical Education.
- Gloria Maria, Mrs. Armistead, Founder Member and Fundraiser, Fetal Alcohol Syndrome Aware UK. For services to Fetal Alcohol Syndrome Awareness and Reduction.
- Sonia Elizabeth, Mrs. Ashworth, Chief Executive, Surrey County Agricultural Society. For services to Farming.
- Ms Anita Astle, Managing Director, Wren Hall Nursing Home. For services to Older People.
- Karen, Mrs. Atkinson, Netball Player and Coach. For services to Netball.
- Jacqueline Lorraine Mary, Mrs. Axelby, Trustee and Non-Executive Director, Azure Charitable Enterprises. For services to Young People with Special Educational Needs.
- Ronald Ayers. For services to Engineering.
- Charles Nicholas Back, Member, Cirdan Sailing Trust, Essex. For services to Young People.
- Samuel James Bailie, Deputy Principal, EU and Employment Relations Division, Department for Employment and Learning, Northern Ireland Executive. For services to Addressing Unemployment.
- Elizabeth Margaret, Mrs. Baines. For services to Bell Ringing in Norfolk and North Suffolk.
- Michael Anthony Baker, ACPO Senior Strategic Manager, Organised Crime Co-ordination Centre, Derbyshire Constabulary. For services to Policing and Tackling Organised Crime.
- Raj Kumar Bali. For services to Inter-faith Relations in Derby and the East Midlands.
- Dr. Anne Barnes, Associate Specialist in Oncology and End of Life Care Ward 10, Withybush General Hospital, Haverfordwest. For services to Cancer Patients in Pembrokeshire.
- Gloria, Mrs. Barnwell. For services to the community in Gorton, Manchester.
- Charles Robert Barr, Joint Managing Director, Centrax Group. For services to Aerospace and Exports from the UK.
- Richard Anthony Barr, Joint Managing Director, Centrax Group. For services to Aerospace and Exports from the UK.
- John Barrie. For services to Badminton.
- Peter Andrew Barron, D.L., Editor, The Northern Echo. For services to Journalism and the community in the North East.
- Dr. Arnab Basu, Chief Executive Officer, Kromek Limited. For services to Regional Development and International Trade.
- Ranjana, Mrs. Bell, Chair, Strategic Independent Advisory Group, Northumbria Police. For services to Minority Ethnic Groups in Tyne and Wear and Northumberland.
- Anne Olivier, Mrs. Bell. For services to Literature and the Arts.
- Peter John Bennion, Assistant Commissioner, St. John Ambulance Training. For voluntary service to St. John Ambulance in the West Midlands.
- Gregory John Bensberg, lately Director, Spectrum Policy, Ofcom. For services to Media and Communications.
- Mary, Mrs. Berg. For voluntary services to Education, Heritage and charity in Canterbury, Kent.
- Clifford Roy Billington, Technical Director, J&P Building Systems. For services to the Construction Industry.
- Anna, Mrs. Bittle, Higher Executive Officer, Work Services Directorate, Department for Work and Pensions. For services to the Unemployed in the London Boroughs of Lambeth and Southwark.
- Michael Peter Blakey. For voluntary services to Young People and to the community in Norfolk.
- Ms Patricia Bleau, Founder, Chantelle Bleau Memorial Fund, and Foster Carer, Bradford. For services to Children, Young People and Families.
- Neil Boast, Volunteer, Suffolk Constabulary. For services to Policing.
- Roy Cecil Boreham, Life Vice-President, National and Essex Federation of Young Farmers Clubs. For services to Young Farmers.
- Miss Alice Sophia Boxall. For voluntary and charitable services to Heritage in Kent.
- Alan Douglas Boyle, Chief Executive, West Fife Enterprise Ltd. For services to Skills Training in Scotland.
- Ms Nicola Bradley, Troubled Families Coordinator, London Borough of Tower Hamlets. For services to Children and Families.
- Doreen, Mrs. Brass, Team Leader, Tain Community Nursing. For services to Healthcare in Ross-shire.
- Louise, Mrs. Brearey, Head, London 2012 Games Team, Health and Safety Executive. For services to the London 2012 Olympic and Paralympic Games and voluntary service to Young People in Sport.
- Mary Josephine, Mrs. Brittain, lately Manager, Schools, Colleges and Community Outreach Department, Nottingham Trent University. For services to Higher Education.
- Nigel Michael Broad, Charge Nurse, Anglesey Ward, Abertawe Bro Morgannwg University Health Board, Swansea. For services to Nursing.
- Miss Jacqueline Margaret Brookes. For services to the Soroptimist International Bilston, West Midlands and the community in Moreton, Staffordshire.
- Alderman Charles James Brown, Councillor, Carrickfergus Borough Council. For services to Local Government in Northern Ireland.
- Iain Brown, Infrastructure Support Manager Afghanistan, KBR. For services to the Armed Forces and the Defence Industry.
- Julie, Mrs. Brown, Ward Sister, Stroke Unit, Nevill Hall Hospital, Abergavenny, Monmouthshire. For services to Nursing and Stroke Services in Wales.
- Robert Woodthorpe Browne, Treasurer, Liberal International. For political service in the UK and Abroad.
- Anne Laura, Mrs. Bryden, lately Language Teacher, St. Edward's Church of England School and Sixth Form College, Havering. For services to Education.
- Kathleen, Mrs. Buckley, Foster Carer, County Durham. For services to Children and Families.
- David James Burbage, Leader, Royal Borough of Windsor and Maidenhead. For services to Local Government.
- Thomas Alan Burch, Farrier. For services to Horse Welfare in the UK and Overseas.
- Carrol Lynn, Mrs. Burdon, Data Sharing Officer, Valuation Office Agency. For services to Customers and the Economy.
- Margaret Jean, Mrs. Burne, J.P. For services to the Magistracy and to the community in Cliburn, Cumbria.
- Kathleen Patricia, Mrs. Burns, Principal, St. Therese Nursery School, Belfast. For services to Education in Northern Ireland.
- Ian Robert Burrell, Chairman, Ambulance Motorcycle Club UK. For services to Motorcycle Safety, particularly through the CRASH Card Scheme.
- Miss Janine Bush, Principal Private Secretary to the Treasury Solicitor, Treasury Solicitor 's Department. For services to the Government Legal Service.
- Dr. Donald Allan Cameron, Founder and managing director, Cameron Balloons. For services to Design and Manufacturing.
- Edward George Campbell, Veterinary Surgeon. For services to Animal Welfare and to the community in Derry.
- Anne Claire, Mrs. Cann, Chair, Board of Trustees, Age Concern Kingston. For voluntary service to Older People.
- Joan Patricia, Mrs. Carberry, Family Learning Co-ordinator, Belfast Metropolitan College. For services to Further Education and the community in Northern Ireland.
- (Lino) Raffaele Claudio Carbosiero, Hair Stylist. For services to Hairdressing.
- Ms Pauline Estelle Carder, Chairman, Arundel Museum Society. For voluntary services to Heritage.
- Jillian Gwendoline, Mrs. Carr, Human Resources Director, Pendennis Shipyard, Falmouth. For services to Education.
- Ms Marie de Assis Carreiro, Artistic Director, Royal Ballet of Flanders. For services to Dance.
- David Alan Carter, lately Manager, Corporate Design and Publishing, Ordnance Survey. For services to Cartography and voluntary service to the National Autistic Society and the Boys' Brigade.
- Eric Victor Cass, Art Collector. For philanthropic service to the Arts.
- Jean Sylvia, Mrs. Cass, Art Collector. For philanthropic service to the Arts.
- Edward David Chantler, Chair, Kent Branch, Royal Agricultural Benevolent Institution. For services to Farming and Rural Communities in Kent.
- Derek Clarke, Artist. For services to Art.
- Guy David Clarke, Higher Officer, CITES Enforcement Team, Border Force, Home Office. For services to Conservation.
- Jonathan Neil Clarke, Leader, Rushcliffe Borough Council. For services to Local Government.
- Ewan David Clayton, Calligrapher. For services to Calligraphy.
- Edmund Patrick Gerard Cochrane, Founder, Downpatrick and County Down Railway. For services to Railway Preservation and Tourism in County Down, Northern Ireland.
- Glenys, Mrs. Cockcroft, Foster Carer, Oldham. For services to Children and Families.
- Harold Cockcroft, Foster Carer, Oldham. For services to Children and Families.
- Anthony James Coffey, Teacher and Director of Learning for Performing Arts and Multi-Media, Landau Forte College, Derbyshire. For services to Education.
- Susan Veronica, Mrs. Eliot-Cohen, D.L. For services to charity and to the community in Ramsbury, Wiltshire.
- Robert Sidney Colhoun, Honorary Secretary, Alpha Badminton Club, Lisburn. For services to Badminton in Northern Ireland.
- Penelope, Mrs. Collard, Chairman, Penderels Trust and Chief Executive, Crossroads Care, Coventry and Warwickshire. For services to People with Disabilities.
- Angela Mary, Mrs. Colman. For services to the community in South East London.
- Ms Carol Joan Compton, Manager, Integrated Youth Support Service, Southend Borough Council. For services to Children and Families.
- Morfydd, Mrs. Conway. For services to the community in Gibbonsdown, Barry, Vale of Glamorgan.
- Margaret Ann, Mrs. Cooper, Commissioner, Aberdeen Girls' Brigade. For voluntary service to the Girls' Brigade and to the community in Aberdeenshire.
- Kathleen Mary, Mrs. Copp. For services to charity and to the community in Rotherham, South Yorkshire.
- Ms Sacha Corcoran, Deputy Director, City and Islington College. For services to Further Education.
- Terry John Cordery. For services to the Dorset Fire Fighters Charity, Dorset Schools' Football Association and to the community in Ferndown, Dorset.
- Peter William Corfield. For services to the community in Ludlow, Shropshire particularly through the Friends of Ludlow Hospital.
- Veronica, Lady Cossons, D.L. President, Shropshire Wildlife Trust. For services to Wildlife Conservation.
- William Victor Cox, Life President, Federation for Detached Youth Work, Leicester and Chair of Trustees, Belvedere Community Activity Centre, Liverpool. For services to Young People.
- Dr. Jacqueline Craissati, Consultant Clinical and Forensic Psychologist and Clinical Director of Forensic Services, Oxleas NHS Trust. For services to Mental Health.
- Ms Ilse Crawford, Interior Designer. For services to Interior Design.
- Keith Noel Crawford, National Vice-Chairman, Royal Naval Association. For voluntary service to Navy Personnel, Veterans and their Families.
- Ms Rosslyn Crocket, Director of Nursing, NHS Greater Glasgow and Clyde. For services to Nursing and Midwifery in Greater Glasgow and Clyde.
- Stuart Cummings, lately Match Official Director, Rugby Football League. For services to Rugby League.
- Miss Joan Elaine Walters Cuthbert, Principal, Culmore Primary School, Derry. For services to Education in Northern Ireland.
- Councillor Katherine Lilian Cutts, lately Leader, Nottinghamshire County Council. For services to Local Government.
- Pauline, Mrs. Dale, Programme Area Manager in Hospitality, Coleg Llandrillo. For services to Further Education in Wales.
- Stephen Bernard Darby, Members' Representative, Operation Florian. For services to International Aid.
- Ms Ilid Davies, Head of Public Protection, London Probation Trust. For services to Public Protection and the Rehabilitation of Residents of Approved Premises.
- Councillor John James Jones Davies, Councillor, Manordeilo and Salem Community Council. For services to the community in Carmarthenshire.
- John Frederick Charles Davis, Children's Illustrator. For services to Children's Literature.
- Linda Kathleen, Mrs. Dawson, Detective Chief Inspector, Hampshire Police. For services to Policing and Victims of Stalking and Harassment.
- Alexandra Graeme, Mrs. Day, Director, Adult Continuing Education, Peter Symonds College, Winchester. For services to Adult Education.
- Rosemary Margaret Elizabeth, Mrs. Day, Environmental Campaigner. For voluntary service to the Environment and to the community in North Devon.
- Paul Victor Dedman. For services to St. John Ambulance and to the community in Steyning, West Sussex.
- Dr. William Forster Dennison, Chair of Governors, Parkview Academy, Chester-le-Street, Co Durham. For services to Education.
- Dennis John Nicoll Dick. For services to Biodiversity, Conservation and Environmental Sustainability in Scotland.
- Brian Dickinson, President, British Disabled Fencing Association. For services to Wheelchair Fencing.
- Ann Davenport Mavroleon, Mrs. Dixon, Volunteer and Organiser, Art for Youth, London. For services to Young People.
- Joan Aileen, Mrs. Doherty, D.L. For voluntary service to the community in Northern Ireland.
- Glenda, Mrs. Dolphin, Lean Change Agent, H.M. Courts and Tribunals Service, North East Region. For services to the Administration of Justice.
- Michael Francis Dooling. For services to Athletics in Merseyside.
- Paul Dorman, Police Staff, Metropolitan Police Service. For services to Policing.
- Anthony John William Douglas, Music Teacher, Morley College, London. For services to Further Education.
- Marion Helen, Mrs. Dowding, lately Deputy Chairman (Political), West Oxfordshire Conservative Association. For voluntary political service.
- Elaine, Mrs. Dowell, Founder, Encephalitis Society. For charitable services to People with Encephalitis and their Families.
- Thomas Roger Drake. For charitable services through the Rotary Club and to the community in Epsom and Ewell, Surrey.
- John Michael Christopher Duffield, President Plymouth and Devon Schools Sailing Association. For services to Sailing.
- Keith Dugmore, Founding Chair, Statistics User Forum. For services to UK Business.
- Ms Edyth Dunlop, Regional Manager, Northern Ireland Union of Supported Employment. For services to People with Disabilities in Northern Ireland.
- Mary, Mrs. Dutton. For services to the community in Brinnington, Cheshire.
- Harry Frederick David Dymond, Area President, St. John Ambulance, Hampshire. For voluntary service to First Aid and Older People.
- Ms Rachel Eleanor May Eade, Automotive Supply Chain Specialist, Manufacturing Advisory Service. For services to Industry.
- Professor Robin Anthony Jeffery Eady, Emeritus Professor, St. John's Institute of Dermatology, University of London. For services to Dermatology and voluntary service to Governance in the Charitable
- Derek Meldrum Edmunds, Specialist Volunteer Tribunal and Court Adviser, Haddington Citizens Advice Bureau. For services to the community in East Lothian.
- Ian Elliott, lately Head Teacher, Ysgol Penmaes, Brecon, Powys. For services to Special Education in Wales.
- Joseph Warden Elliott, Chairman of Board of Trustees, Coventry Transport Museum. For services to Museums.
- Miss Joyce Ellis, Founder and Musical Director, Kinder Children's Choirs of the High Peak. For services to Music and Young People in Derbyshire.
- Denise Laraine, Mrs. Englefied, Senior Executive Officer, Ministry of Defence. For services to the Army Welfare Service.
- Ms Aysha Esakji, Prevent Officer, London Borough of Hammersmith and Fulham and Royal Borough of Kensington and Chelsea. For services to Challenging Extremism and Empowering
- Melvyn Evans. For services to Crown Green Bowling.
- Lynda Mary, Mrs. Fairbrother, Chair, Women's Technical Committee, British Gymnastics. For services to Gymnastics.
- Kathleen Anne, Mrs. Farnell, Founder, Butterfly Thyroid Cancer Trust. For services to Thyroid Cancer Research and people with thyroid cancer.
- Kathleen, Mrs. Ferguson, Founder and Honorary Secretary, Brainwaves Northern Ireland. For services to People with Brain Tumours and their Families.
- Miss Susan Marian Fernley, Manager, Legacy Department, Royal National Lifeboat Institution. For services to Maritime Safety.
- Terence Edward Fillary. For services to Historic Building Restoration and Conservation.
- Nigel Robert Finch, General Manager, North Down Training Ltd. For services to Unemployed and Disadvantaged People in Northern Ireland.
- Elizabeth, Mrs. Findlater, President, West Lothian County Girl Guides. For services to the Guiding Movement in Scotland.
- Nicola Rosemary, Mrs. Fletcher. For services to the Venison Industry.
- Harriet Virginia, Mrs. Foges, Foster Carer, London Borough of Camden. For services to Children and Families.
- John Nicholas Fogg. For services to the Marlborough International Jazz Festival and to the community in Marlborough, Wiltshire.
- Dr. Diana Rosemary Forrest, Director of Public Health, Knowsley Health and Wellbeing Headquarters, Merseyside. For services to Public Health.
- Christopher Laurence Foster, lately HEO, Education Standards Directorate Support Team, Department for Education. For services to Education and the community in Durham.
- Ms Moya Foster, Senior Service Manager, Families in Need, Blackpool Council. For services to Children and Families.
- Paul James Foster. For services to Bowls.
- Lesley Gaynor, Mrs. Frazer, Policy Manager, Clinks. For services to Law and Order and Criminal Justice.
- Ms Christine Frost, Chief Executive, Merton Voluntary Service Council. For services to the Voluntary Sector (to be dated 6 November 2013).
- Solomon Fubara. For services to the Black, Minority and Ethnic community in the South West.
- Dr. Sadhu Singh Gakhal, Vice Chair, British Sikh Consultative Forum. For services to the Sikh Community.
- Dean Thomas Gardiner, Senior Manager D, H.M. Prison Wormwood Scrubs. For services to Prisoners and to the community in Erith, particularly through St. John Ambulance.
- Jeffrey Gardner, Director, Berkshire Youth, and Vice-President, National Boys and Girls Club. For services to Young People.
- David Eveleigh Gibbings, Archivist, AugustaWestland. For services to Aviation Heritage and the Defence Industry.
- Natalie, Mrs. Gibson. For services to Fashion and Textile Design.
- Ms Berenice Shelley Gilbert. For services to Bereaved Children and their Families through the Grief Encounter Project Charity.
- Patric Alan Gilchrist, Executive Director, Theatre by the Lake, Keswick. For services to the Arts.
- Dr. Claire Anne Gilligan, Senior Vice-President, Global Quality, Warner Chilcott Group. For services to Research and Development in the Pharmaceutical Industry in Northern Ireland and
- Wilma, Mrs. Gilluley, Principal Teacher, Personal, Social and Health Department, Airdrie Academy. For services to Education and charity.
- Catherine, Mrs. Glass, Trauma and Orthopaedics Manager, Altnagelvin Hospital. For services to Healthcare.
- Eileen, Mrs. Granger, Fundraiser, CLIC Sargent. For charitable services.
- Dr. Claude Loren Gray, lately Chairman, Friends of Devon's Archives. For voluntary services to Heritage in Devon.
- Ann Eileen, Mrs. Green, Special Educational Needs Teacher, Speech and Language Centre, Croydon. For services to Education.
- Tracy Louise, Mrs. Green, Family Intervention Service Manager, Plymouth City Council. For services to Children and Families.
- Michael Keith Greene. For services to Health and to the community in Whitehaven, Cumbria.
- Peter Clifford Grover, Cub Scout Leader, 8th Norwich Sea Scout Group. For services to Children and Young People.
- Dr. Karen Elizabeth Groves, Consultant in Palliative Medicine, West Lancashire, Southport and Formby. For services to Palliative Care.
- Wilma Bryden, Mrs. Gunn, Founder, Scottish Heart at Risk Testing. For services to Cardiac Health and to charity in Scotland.
- Brij-Mohan Gupta, lately President, National Council of Hindu Temples. For services to Inter-Faith Cohesion.
- Rosemary Florence, Mrs. Gutteridge, J.P., D.L., Fundraiser, Cambridgeshire Branch, British Red Cross. For voluntary and charitable service to the British Red Cross Society.
- John Richard Hadden, Chairman, Techno Tyrone Ltd. For services to Economic Development and Rural Regeneration in Omagh, County Tyrone, Northern Ireland.
- Moira, Mrs. Hamilton, J.P., lately Chair, Abbeyfield Dunfermline Society Ltd. For voluntary service in Fife.
- Dr. Geoffrey Peter Hanlon, General Practitioner, Leicestershire. For services to Primary Care.
- Ms Michele Deborah Harris, Family Recovery Project Manager, London Borough of Wandsworth. For services to Children and Families.
- Ms Sylvia Christine Harris, Community Worker, YMCA. For services to the community in Wolverhampton.
- Agnes McDougall Brock, Mrs. Hart. For voluntary service in Sutherland.
- Ms Denise Claire Hartley. For voluntary services to the community in Ingol, Lancashire.
- William Andrew John Hassard, Director of Parks and Leisure, Belfast City Council. For services to Local Government.
- Warwick John Seymer Hawkins, Grade 7, Faith and Participation Team, Department for Communities and Local Government. For services to Interfaith Relations.
- Councillor Mark Damian Hawthorne, Leader, Gloucestershire County Council. For services to Local Government.
- Elizabeth Patrick, Mrs. Hay, Community Nurse, Aviemore Health Centre. For services to Healthcare and charity.
- Ann, Mrs. Hayes. For services to the University of the Third Age and to the community in Northern Ireland.
- Michael Morris Hayman, Entrepreneur. For services to Enterprise Promotion, Entrepreneurship and Education.
- Ms Judith Herbertson, lately Deputy Head, Somalia Unit, Foreign and Commonwealth Office. For services to Education and International Development.
- Miss Michelle Ann Herring. For voluntary and charitable services particularly through St. John Ambulance.
- Ms Lucie May Heyes, Social Worker and Media Spokesperson, College of Social Work. For services to Children and Families.
- John Nigel Garth Heywood. For services to the community in Chepstow and the Wye Valley.
- Anthony Philip Higgins, Ministry of Defence. For services to Defence.
- Richard Hill, lately Chairman, Northern Ireland Screen. For services to Broadcast Media in Northern Ireland.
- Sidney Robert Hill. For services to the community in Angus.
- Henry Peter Graham Hinde. For voluntary service to the Environment.
- Michael John Hippisley. For services to the Samaritans in Dundee.
- Miss Anne Henrietta Drake Hoblyn, Higher Executive Officer, Work Services Directorate, Department for Work and Pensions. For services to the Unemployed and the community in Epsom, Surrey.
- Miss Lucy Hodges. For services to Blind Sailing.
- John Home, Owner and Director, Willowdene Farm Rehabilitation and Training Centre. For services to the Rehabilitation of Offenders.
- The Reverend Lionel Hopkins, lately Chaplain, H.M.P. Swansea. For services to Prison Staff and Prisoners and to the community in Swansea.
- Miss Sharon Houfe, Police Constable, Humberside Police. For services to Policing.
- Susan Ann, Mrs. Hough, Chief Executive, Dorset County Football Association. For services to Women's and Disability Football.
- Margaret, Mrs. Houghton, Head of French, Carmel College, St. Helens. For services to Education.
- Martin David Howell, Director, Business in the Community Northern Ireland. For services to Corporate Social Responsibility.
- Margaret Jean Bruce, Mrs. Howman. For services to the Conservation and Protection of the UK Countryside.
- John Henry Raymond Hoyles. For services to Agriculture and to the community in Wisbech, Cambridgeshire.
- Nighat, Mrs. Hubbard, Detective Constable, Metropolitan Police Service. For charitable services.
- The Reverend Canon Alan Hughes, T.D. For services to the community in Berwick upon Tweed, Northumberland.
- Gillian, Mrs. Hughes, Head of Community Safety, Bolton Council. For services to Children and Families.
- Christopher John Gerard Hukins. For voluntary service to the Prison Service and to the community in Templecombe, Somerset.
- Adam Michael Noel Hunt, Force Solicitor, Essex Police. For services to Policing.
- Roger John Hurrion, County Vice-President, Greater London South West Scouts. For services to Young People.
- Timothy Edward Husbands, Chief Executive, Titanic Belfast. For services to Economic Development and Tourism in Northern Ireland.
- Mahammed Ameenuddin Hussain, Manager, Asian Resource Centre, Greenwich. For services to Adult Education and to the community in Greenwich.
- Carole Maureen, Mrs. Hyde, lately Chairman, Conservative Party Disciplinary Committee. For voluntary political service.
- Michael Victor Hymanson. For charitable services to Children and Young Adults with Terminal or Life Threatening Conditions in the North West.
- John Hamilton Innerdale, Chairman, Mountain Heritage Trust. For voluntary services to Preserving and Promoting Mountain Heritage.
- Peter Thurston Inskip, Conservation Architect. For services to Conservation.
- Betty Margaret, Mrs. Insley, Foster Carer, Plymouth. For services to Children and Families.
- John Insley, Foster Carer, Plymouth. For services to Children and Families.
- Richard Jackson, Founder, Mancroft International. For services to Development and Corporate Training Services.
- Linda Ann, Mrs. James, Chief Executive Officer, BulliesOut. For voluntary services to Young People.
- Judith, Mrs. Jardine, Headteacher, Hightae Primary School, Hightae, Lockerbie. For services to Education in Dumfries and Galloway.
- Dr. Satbir Singh Jassal, General Practitioner and Medical Director, Rainbows Hospice for Children and Young People. For services to Palliative Care for Children and Young People.
- Ms Christine John, Senior Policy Adviser, Department for Business, Innovation and Skills. For services to the Regional Growth Fund and voluntary service to Civil Aid.
- Martin James Johnson, J.P., Managing Director, Quality Freight Services Ltd. For services to Business.
- Ms Hazel Adams Johnstone, Department Manager, Gender Institute, London School of Economics and Political Science. For services to Higher Education.
- Professor Albert Mark Jones, Head of Conservation, Mary Rose Trust. For services to the Conservation of the Mary Rose.
- Owen Jones, Basket Maker. For services to Basket Making.
- Efa Catrin, Mrs. Gruffudd Jones, Chief Executive, Urdd Gobaith Cymru. For services to Children and Young People in Wales and to Welsh Culture.
- Rosemary Julie, Mrs. Jordan, Volunteer, Riding for the Disabled. For services to People with Disabilities in Northern Ireland.
- Andrew Judge, Commercial Manager, Recognition, Salford, H.M. Revenue and Customs. For services to Government Procurement.
- Dr. Davinder Kumar Kapur. For services to Healthcare in Northern Ireland and Abroad.
- Angela Margaret, Mrs. Kay, Artistic Director, Music for Everyone. For services to Music in Nottinghamshire.
- Ms Allyson Jane Kaye, Founder, Ovarian Cancer Action. For services to People with Ovarian Cancer.
- Thomas Kelly, Founder and Manager, Johnstone Credit Union. For services to Financial Services and the community.
- Anthony Edward Kemp, Vice-Chairman, British Association for Immediate Care. For services to Pre-hospital Emergency Care.
- David John Kemp, Music Teacher and Assistant Headteacher, Queen Elizabeth Humanities College, Herefordshire. For services to Education.
- Dr. Michael Joseph Kennedy, Birkenhead Youth and Community Worker, Merseyside. For services to Children and Families.
- Nicolas Charles Kennedy. For services to the community in Blackburn, Lancashire.
- Dr. Nigel Wells Kerby, Managing Director, Mylnefield Research Services Ltd. For services to Business and Science.
- Jean Elizabeth, Mrs. Kershaw, lately Deputy Director, Helmsley Arts Centre. For services to Art.
- Faiza, Mrs. Khan, Deputy Chief Executive, National Council for Voluntary Youth Services. For services to Young People.
- Fathir Khan. For services to the Asian community in Sheffield, South Yorkshire.
- Yasmin Shabir, Mrs. Khan, Administrative Officer, Personal Tax, Bradford, H.M. Revenue and Customs. For services to Equality and Diversity.
- Malcolm Kielty. For services to Wheelchair Rugby League.
- Muriel, Mrs. Kimmons, lately History Teacher, Netherthorpe School, Derbyshire. For services to Education.
- Kathleen Mary, Mrs. Kinninmont, Chief Executive Officer, Women in Film and Television Ltd. For services to Women in the UK Film and Television Industries.
- Hugh Mcdonald Kirk, President, London Rotary. For charitable services in the UK and Abroad.
- Angela Joan, Mrs. Kirkham, Manager, Victoria Brook Childcare Centre and Nursery School, Chadderton, Oldham. For services to Children and Families.
- Gladys Alanna, Mrs. Knight, Writer. For services to Literature.
- Dr. Barbara Helen Knowles, Senior Science Policy Adviser, Society of Biology. For services to Science Communication and the Environment.
- Martin Philip Kolton. For services to the Hairdressing Industry, particularly Youth Training.
- Dr. Khalid Koser, lately Chair, Independent Advisory Group on Country Information. For services to Refugees and Asylum Seekers in the UK.
- Dr. Marie-Genevieve Marguerite Lane, J.P. For voluntary services to the community in Surrey.
- Professor Peter Reginald Lansley, Professor Emeritus of Construction Management, University of Reading. For services to Research into Ageing and Well-Being of Older People.
- Stephen John Lavender, Co-Managing Director, Lavender International. For services to the Economy and Regeneration.
- James Niel Lee. For voluntary service to the Community First Programme in Anglesey.
- Professor William Robert Lee. For services to the Restoration of Birkenhead Park and the community in Birkenhead, Merseyside.
- Thomas Alan Lee. For services to Children with Special Needs in Cheshire.
- Ms Jayne Leeson, Chief Executive, Changing Our Lives. For services to People with Intellectual Disabilities.
- Councillor Andrew Iain Lewer, lately Leader, Derbyshire County Council. For services to Local Government.
- Dr. Gerald Lewis, Chair, Board of Governors, Swansea Metropolitan University. For services to Education in Wales.
- Dr. Kenton Richard Lewis, Partnership Manager, the Higher Education Academy. For services to Higher Education.
- Mei Xia, Mrs. Li. For services to the Chinese community and Community Cohesion in Liverpool, Merseyside.
- Dr. Robert Anthony Fox Linton, Chairman, MOD Research Ethics Committee. For services to Medicine and to Defence.
- James Alan Little, Honorary Librarian, The All England Club, Wimbledon. For services to Tennis.
- Arthur William Littlefair. For services to the community and to the Kirkby Stephen Mountain Rescue Team in Kirkby Stephen, Cumbria.
- Susan Joan, Mrs. Lloyd, Synthetic Phonics Advocate. For services to Education.
- David John Lodge, Chair of Grants Committee, Friends of Essex Churches Trust. For services to Building Conservation.
- James Lohan, co-Founder, Mr and Smith. For services to the Travel Industry.
- Suzanne Katherine, Mrs. Lomax, Nurse, Departmental Manager, Complex Care and Stroke, Bolton NHS Foundation Trust. For services to Healthcare.
- William John Lonsdale, Teacher of the Performing Arts, Sandbach School, Cheshire. For services to Education.
- Ms Olivia Francoise Danielle (Liv) Lorent, Founder and Artistic Director, balletLorent. For services to Dance.
- Dr. Susan Loughlin, Head of Volcanology, British Geological Survey. For services to Volcanology.
- Michael Lowry, Manager, Barton Moss Secure Care Centre, Salford. For services to Children.
- Ms Keira Jane MacDougall. For voluntary and charitable services in Scotland through the Dystophic Epidermolysis Bullosa Research Association and the Second Chance Project.
- Dr. Heather Susan Mackinnon, lately Consultant General Paediatrician, Whittington Hospital, London. For services to Paediatrics, Child Health and Child Protection.
- Christine Anderson, Mrs. MacPhee. For services to Scottish Highland Dancing.
- Elaine Suzanne Dorothy, Mrs. Maggs. For services to the community in Haslemere, Surrey.
- Brian Mahony, director, Forest Enterprise England. For services to Forestry, the Environment and Recreation.
- Dominic John Grehan Mahony. For voluntary services to Modern Pentathlon.
- Ian John Mansfield, Police Constable, City of London Police. For services to Counter-Terrorism.
- David Anthony Mark, Chairman, Westway Housing Association. For services to the community.
- Ruth, Mrs. Marshall, Ministry of Defence. For services to Defence.
- Ms Anne-Marie Martin, lately Head, The Careers Group, University of London. For services to Higher Education.
- Barrie Robert Martin, Chair of Governors, Queen Elizabeth's School, Barnet. For services to Education.
- Christopher Martin, lately Commander (Retained), Lydney Station. For services to Fire and Rescue.
- Joan Hilda, Mrs. Martin, J.P., Governor, Northampton School for Girls and former Headteacher. For services to Education.
- Ms Eleanor Anne (Annie) Mawson, Founder, Sunbeams Music Trust. For services to Music Therapy in Cumbria.
- John Paul Maytum, Chair, Leathermarket JMB (Joint Management Board). For services to the community in Bermondsey.
- Joseph David McAree, lately Chairman, Dungannon Swifts Football Club. For services to Sport and to the community in Northern Ireland.
- Councillor Eileen McCartin, Councillor, Renfrewshire Council. For political service.
- Kevin McCloud, Television Presenter, Grand Designs. For services to Sustainable Design and Energy Saving Property Refurbishment.
- The Reverend Canon Roy McCullough. For services to the Church of England particularly the Preservation of the Built Heritage of Churches through the Diocesan Advisory Committee in Lancashire.
- Paul Ian McDermott, Senior Executive Officer, Ministry of Defence. For services to Operational Helicopter Capability.
- Dr. Alistair Iain McFadyen, Special Constable, West Yorkshire Police. For services to Policing and the community.
- Clinton Paul McFarlane, Business Support Manager, Office of the Parliamentary Counsel. For public service and services to the community in the London Borough of Hackney.
- Ms Patricia Ann McGrath, Makeup Artist. For services to the Fashion and Beauty Industry.
- Dr. Heather Sylvia McHaffie, Scottish Plants Officer, The Royal Botanic Garden, Edinburgh. For services to the Conservation of Plants in Scotland.
- John McInnes. For charitable services.
- Ms Margaret Mary McKenna, Co-founder and Director, Learning Pool. For services to Digital Technology, Innovation and Learning.
- Patricia Mary, Mrs. McLaughlin. For services to Tourism and to the community in Shropshire.
- Miss Katy McLean. For services to Women's Rugby.
- Faye Ann, Mrs. McLeod. For services to Broadcasting and to the community in Northern Ireland.
- Kevin McLoughlin, Founder and Managing Director, K&M Decorating Ltd. For services to Skills Training in the Painting and Decorating Trade.
- Patricia Ann, Mrs. McQuillan, Independent Member, Coleraine Policing and Community Safety Partnership. For services to the Rural Community in Northern Ireland.
- Susan Jessica, Mrs. McVeigh, Senior Officer, Operational Delivery Profession, Development and Capability Manager, H.M. Revenue and Customs. For services to Customer Service Delivery.
- Elizabeth Rosemary, Mrs. Meek, Miniature Artist. For services to the Arts.
- Carl Christiaan Meewezen, Deputy Director, Management Information, Cabinet Office. For services to Government Efficiency.
- Roger Lewis Harold Merton. For services to London Youth (the London Federation of Youth Clubs), Football and the community in Hertfordshire.
- David Kenneth Metherell, Co-Founder, The Elizabeth Foundation. For services to People with Hearing Impairments and their Families.
- Shirley, Mrs. Metherell, Co-Founder, The Elizabeth Foundation. For services to People with Hearing Impairments and their Families.
- Alison Lynda, Mrs. Middleton, J.P., Senior Executive Officer, Academy Converters Division, Infrastructure and Funding Directorate, Department for Education. For services to Education and the community in Rotherham.
- Brian Leslie Miles, Board Director, All Saints Community Development Company, Birmingham. For services to Young People.
- May, Mrs. Millward, lately Senior Executive Officer, Human Resources, Department for Work and Pensions. For services to Mediation in the Workplace and to the community in West Lothian.
- Norman Watson Mitchell, Founder, Chair and Volunteer, West Indian Senior Citizens Organisation. For services to Older People in London.
- Sally-Ann, Mrs. Mitchell, Honorary Secretary, Norfolk Branch, Royal Agricultural Benevolent Institution. For services to Farming and Rural Communities in Norfolk.
- Barry Colin Mizen, Joint Chair, The Jimmy Mizen Foundation. For services for Young People in London.
- Margaret Annette, Mrs. Mizen, Joint Chair, The Jimmy Mizen Foundation. For services for Young People in London.
- Dr. Dilys Morgan, Head, Department for Gastrointestinal, Emerging and Zoonotic Infections, Public Health England. For services to Health Protection.
- George Morgan, Chairman, Pektron Group Ltd. For services to Electronic Engineering.
- Jason Morgan, Chief Executive, Charlton Athletic Community Trust. For services to Football in the community.
- Robert Vernon Morris. For services to the community particularly Heritage in Gloucester.
- Ms Anna Moss, Managing Director, General Counsel, Belfast, Citigroup Global Markets Ltd. For services to Economic Development in Northern Ireland.
- Pauline, Mrs. Mulholland, Lead Professional Dietician and Allied Health Professions Lead for Hospital Services, South Eastern Trust. For services to Dietetics and Healthcare in Northern Ireland.
- Nicholas Simon Munting, Sous Chef, House of Commons. For services to Parliament and to Young People in Croydon.
- Miss Dominique Murphy, Senior Executive Officer, Ministry of Defence. For services to Defence.
- Michael Andrew Murphy. For services to Business and Digital Media.
- Miss Margaret Murray, Music Teacher. For services to Music.
- Dr. Martin Adrian Myers, Consultant Clinical Scientist, Clinical Biochemistry Department, Royal Preston Hospital, Lancashire. For services to Healthcare Science.
- Basil Joseph Warren Newby. For services to Business and the Lesbian, Gay, Bisexual and Transgender community in Blackpool, Lancashire.
- Margaret, Mrs. Nicholson. For services to Education in the North East of England.
- John McAdam Niven, lately Chief Engineer, Border Force, Home Office. For services to the Protection of the UK Border and to the community in Northern Ireland.
- Stuart Jeffery Nixon, Trustee and Vice-Chair, Multiple Sclerosis Society. For voluntary service to People with Multiple Sclerosis.
- David Attlee Norman, lately Chair, Governing Executive, Ruskin College, Oxford. For services to Adult Education.
- Alison, Mrs. O'Connell. For services to the Voluntary Sector in Birmingham.
- Michael Paul Patrick O'Driscoll, Mental Health Nurse, Nottinghamshire Healthcare NHS Trust. For services to Mental Health Nursing.
- Mary Patricia, Mrs. O'Kane, Proprietor, Beech Hill Country House Hotel, Derry. For services to Tourism and Hospitality in Northern Ireland.
- William Ronald Oldcroft, Chair, Board of Governors, Omagh High School. For services to Education in Northern Ireland.
- Robert Oliver, lately Bill Manager, Department for Health and Social Services, Welsh Government. For services to the Legislative Process in the UK, particularly Wales.
- Joseph O'Raw, Historian. For services to Military Heritage in Lanarkshire.
- Councillor Marianne Jane Overton, Vice-Chair, Local Government Association. For services to Local Government.
- Ms Barbara Elizabeth Page, Dermatology Liaison Nurse Specialist, Queen Margaret Hospital, Dunfermline. For services to Dermatological Nursing.
- Dr. Marios Papadopoulos, Founder and Music Director, Oxford Philomusica. For services to Music in Oxford.
- Joy Marion, Mrs. Park. For services to Waltham Forest Community Credit Union.
- Ms Janet Lynn Paterson, Director of Olympic Relations, British Olympic Association. For services to Sport.
- Tapshum, Mrs. Pattni, Assistant Director, Adult Social Care, Birmingham Social Services. For services to Social Care.
- John Barry Payton, Co-Founder and lately Manager, Haslingden Community Link and Children's Centre, Lancashire. For services to Children and Families.
- Ruth Alexandra Elizabeth Jones, Mrs. Peet, Writer and Actress. For services to Entertainment.
- Ms Carol Pemberton, Music Director and Singer, Black Voices. For services to Music.
- Ms Tamara Heber-Percy, Co-Founder, Mr and Smith. For services to the Travel Industry.
- Kathleen Wendy Herald, Mrs. Peyton, Children's Author. For services to Children's Literature.
- Derek John Phillips, Foster Carer, Bedfordshire. For services to Children and Families.
- Hazel Catherine, Mrs. Phillips, Foster Carer, Bedfordshire. For services to Children and Families.
- John Phillips, Co-Chair, Learning Partnership Board, Isle of Wight. For services to People with Learning Disabilities.
- Karin Margery, Mrs. Phillips, Head of Community Safety, Welsh Government. For services to Community Safety in Wales and the community in Cardiff.
- Peter John Harold Philpot, Farmer. For services to Agriculture, the Rural Economy, Education and Young People in Essex.
- Neal Kenneth Pickersgill, Watch Manager, Urban Search and Rescue Team, Greater Manchester Fire and Rescue Service. For services to Search and Rescue in the UK and Abroad.
- John Barton Pickup. For voluntary services to Community Cricket.
- Candida Jane, Mrs. Piercy, Member, Liberal Democrats' Federal Executive Committee. For voluntary political service.
- Ms Lisa Clare Pinney, Head, Strategic Co-ordination, Environment Agency. For services to Equality in the Workplace.
- Dr. Peter Clive Crawford Pitt, T.D., Medical Escort. For voluntary service to the Royal British Legion and Heroes Return.
- Ms Veda Poon, Deputy Director, G8 Policy, European and Global Issues Secretariat, Cabinet Office. For services to the UK's Presidency of the G8 in 2013.
- Lesley Ann, Mrs. Potts, Senior Manager, PWC. For services to Energy Efficiency and the Green Deal and voluntary service through Changing Faces.
- Keith Graham Pratley. For services to the community in Hereford.
- Gwilym Vaughan Price, National Director of Sport, Independent Schools Association. For services to Education and Sport.
- Miss Jane Evelyn Pritchard, Curator of Dance, Theatre and Performance Collections, Victoria and Albert Museum. For services to the Arts.
- Dr. Deborah Anne Pullen, Director, Modern Built Environment Knowledge Transfer Network and Group Research Director, BRE. For services to Innovation and Knowledge Transfer.
- Jason Paul Purveur, Grade 7, Ministry of Defence. For services to Defence Acquisition.
- Ann, Mrs. Rae, Chair of Governors, Selly Park Technology College. For services to Education.
- Josephine, Mrs. Randolph. For services to Swimming and to the community in Tamworth, Staffordshire.
- Patrick Otto Rarden, Special Inspector, City of London Police. For services to Policing.
- Miss Zanib Rasool. For services to the community in Rotherham, South Yorkshire.
- Diane, Mrs. Rathfield, General Manager, Roe Valley Education Forum and Women's Network. For services to the community in Northern Ireland.
- Graham William Redgrave, Chief Airworthiness Engineer, Marshall Aerospace. For services to the RAF and the Defence Industry.
- Daniel Joseph Regan. For services to charity and to the community in East and South East London.
- Marion, Mrs. Regan, Owner, Hugh Lowe Farms. For services to the Fruit and Vegetable Industry.
- Dr. Dominic Rhodes, Research Fellow, National Nuclear Laboratory. For services to Science.
- Susan Mary, Mrs. Rhodes. For services to charity and to the community in Warwick, Warwickshire.
- John Herbert Richardson, Foster Carer, Exmouth, Devon. For services to Children and Families.
- Mary Patricia, Mrs. Richardson, Foster Carer, Exmouth, Devon. For services to Children and Families.
- Ann Susan Elizabeth, Lady Riches. For voluntary services to Improving Healthcare in London.
- John Barry Lloyd Roberts. For services to Athletics and to the community in Oswestry, Shropshire.
- Agnes Satherer, Mrs. Robertson, lately Chair, Renfrewshire Children's Panel Advisory Committee. For services to the Children's Hearings System in Scotland.
- Professor Christine Diana Robertson, Professor and Head, Institute of Education, University of Worcester. For services to Higher Education.
- Dr. Carol Robinson, Special Educational Needs Consultant. For services to Children with Special Educational Needs.
- Miss Kathleen Margaret Robinson, Chair of Governors, Bishop Thomas Grant School, Lambeth. For services to Education.
- Dr. Anna-Maria Rollin, Consultant Anaesthetist, Epsom and St. Helier University Hospitals NHS Trust. For services to Anaesthesia.
- Catherine Young Lees, Mrs. Robertson-Ross. For services to Service Men and Women, Veterans and their families in the UK.
- Estelle Ann, Mrs. Rowe, National Director, Headstart Programme, Engineering Development Trust, Birmingham. For services to Education.
- Lieutenant Colonel Stuart Arthur James Rowsell, Trustee, North Hampshire Medical Education Trust. For charitable services in South East England.
- Ms Janet Catherine Mary Rubin, Independent Member, Competition Service and Competition Appeal Tribunal. For services to Industry and Public Sector Bodies.
- John George Ruddick, Musical Director, Midland Youth Jazz Orchestra. For services to Jazz.
- Eileen, Mrs. Rumble. For services to Embroidery.
- Dr. Malcolm Quentin Russell, Medical Incident Officer, West Midlands Ambulance Service NHS Trust. For services to Emergency Medicine.
- John Ryan, Pro Vice-Chancellor for Students, University of Worcester. For services to Higher Education.
- Ms Maureen Grimmer Ryles, Head of Paediatric Physiotherapy, NHS Grampian. For services to Healthcare and charity.
- Bisakha, Mrs. Sarker. For services to South Asian Dance in Merseyside.
- Gillian Margaret, Mrs. Saunders, Founder, The FAN Charity. For services to Community Cohesion in Wales and elsewhere through the promotion of FAN Groups.
- Ian Gordon Scott. For services to Archeology in Scotland.
- Flight Lieutenant James Douglas Scott, Chairman, Edinburgh, Lothians and Borders Branch, RAF Association. For voluntary service to the RAF Association.
- Peter John Sculpher, Policing Sergeant, Lancashire Constabulary and Community Volunteer. For services to Policing and the community.
- Christopher John Seddon, Director, Seddon Group Ltd. For services to Apprenticeships and the community in the North West through the Seddon Charitable Trust.
- Miss Georgina Joy Seddon, Co-Founder and Co-Organiser, Welcome International Students of Cambridge. For services to Higher Education and International Relations.
- Robert George Serman. For services to Conservation and to the community in Haslemere, Surrey.
- Kevin Brendan Shakeshaft, Higher Officer, Criminal Investigation Directorate, HMRC. For services to Criminal Investigation, Officer Safety Training, and voluntary service to the community in Suffolk.
- Neil Shawcross, Artist. For services to Arts in Northern Ireland.
- Miss Angela Elizabeth Shearer, Committee Chair, Relay for Life Peterhead, Aberdeenshire. For charitable services to Cancer Research UK.
- Mark Richard Shearman, Photographer. For services to Sports Photography.
- Quinton Hosford Ernest O'Brien Shillingford. For services to Boxing and Young People.
- Ms Julia Lesley Sibley, Chief Executive, Savoy Educational Trust. For services to the Hospitality Industry.
- Salim Sidat. For services to the community and Policing in Blackburn, Lancashire.
- Gulam Siddiquie, General Secretary, Lanarkshire Muslim Welfare Society. For services to Cultural Integration and to the community in Lanarkshire.
- Robert David Taylor Sillett. For services to the community and to charity in Billingshurst, West Sussex.
- Councillor John David Simmonds, Member, Kent County Council. For services to Local Government.
- Helen, Mrs. Sinclair, Founder, Friends of the Animals. For services to Animal Welfare.
- Edward Slater, National Chairman, Normandy Veterans Association. For voluntary service to Normandy Veterans.
- Joan, Mrs Slight, Services Manager, Historic Scotland. For services to History in Scotland and voluntary service through the Girls' Brigade.
- Richard Christopher Maurice Smart, Chair of Governors, Our Lady's Roman Catholic Primary School, Princethorpe, Rugby, Warwickshire. For services to Education.
- John Stanley Smith, Chair, Board of Governors, Crumlin Integrated College and vice-chair, Board of Governors, Grange Park Primary and St. Malachy's Primary Schools. For services to Education.
- Peter Norman Sparling. For services to the Arts, Education and to the community in West Yorkshire.
- Nigel Robin Charles Spencer, Teacher, All Saints Church of England Primary School, Essex. For services to Education.
- Barbara Ann, Mrs. Spooner, Team Leader, Intelligence Collection, Serious Organised Crime Agency. For services to Law Enforcement.
- Avril Shirley, Mrs. Spriggs. For voluntary service to Gymnastics.
- Miss Jacqueline Holly Stacey, Director, Governance and Party Services, Labour Party. For political service.
- George Stevenson, Member, Ulster Branch, Tennis Ireland. For services to Tennis in Northern Ireland.
- Eric Robert Stokes. For services to Lifesaving and Lifeguarding in Kent.
- Richard Brian Sutherland, Honorary Chair, Board of Trustees, Birtenshaw School, Bolton. For services to Education and the community in Bolton.
- Anne Margaret, Mrs. Tait, lately General Council Assessor, University of Edinburgh. For services to Education.
- Richard Talbot. For services to the community in Stoke-on-Trent, Staffordshire.
- Joan Susan Younger, Mrs. Taylor, Midwife, NHS Fife. For services to Complementary Therapies.
- Dr. Rosalind Taylor, D.L., Medical Director, The Hospice of St. Francis, Hertfordshire. For services to Hospice Care.
- Dr. Natalie Miriam Teich. For services to Public Health.
- Josephine Jean, Mrs. Thorpe, Founder, Ryedale Wildlife Rehabilitation. For services to Wildlife Rescue in Yorkshire.
- Dr. Laura Tilling. For services to the communities in Castle Cary, Somerset and Mufulira, Zambia.
- Peter Tong. For services to Broadcasting and Music.
- Wendy Catherine, Mrs. Townshend, Senior Scientific Officer, Ministry of Defence. For service to the Royal Navy.
- Dr. Carol Agnes Trotter, Consultant Psychiatrist, Portsmouth. For services to Mental Health.
- Ms Helen Tse, director, Sweet Mandarin. For services to the Food and Drink Sector.
- Ms Lisa Tse, Chief Executive Officer and Head Chef, Sweet Mandarin. For services to the Food and Drink Sector.
- Elizabeth Rose, Mrs. Tullberg, D.L. For services to the community in Swale, Kent.
- Graham Turner, lately Chief Executive, North Somerset Council. For services to Local Government.
- Professor Paul Alan Tyler, Professor of Deep-Sea Biology and Professorial Research Fellow, University of Southampton National Oceanography Centre. For services to Science.
- Maureen Ann, Mrs. Upton, District Manager, West Midlands Region, St. John Ambulance. For voluntary service to St. John Ambulance.
- Anne Virginia, Mrs. Villiers, Chairman, Westminster Society for People with Learning Disabilities. For services to People with Learning Disabilities.
- Catherine Mary, Mrs. Walker, Deputy Controller, Volunteer Support, SSAFA. For services to Ex- Servicemen and Women.
- James Walker. Councillor, West Lothian Council. For services to the community in Bathgate, West Lothian.
- Ursula Jane Barling, Mrs. Walton. For services to the Magistracy and to Education in Chorley and Preston, Lancashire.
- Elliott Ward, Chair of Governors, Dame Allan Schools, Newcastle upon Tyne. For services to Education and to the community in Newcastle.
- Richard Anthony Warner, Founder, Reepham Green Team. For services to Energy Efficiency in Norfolk.
- Lesley Susan, Mrs. Watling. For public service.
- Christine Mary, Mrs. Watson, Manager for Discovery, Swansea University. For services to Student Volunteering and to Education in Swansea.
- Anne Philomena, Mrs. Webber, Principal Teacher, Intensive Support for Reading, Angus. For services to Children with Additional Support Needs in Angus.
- Councillor Alan Edward Weinberg, Chair of Governors, Beal High School, Ilford. For services to Education and the community in the London Borough of Redbridge.
- Margaret Maureen Johnston, Mrs. Weir, Chair, Board of Governors, Ligoniel Primary School, Belfast. For services to Education in Northern Ireland.
- John Michael Welbank, Councilman, City of London Corporation. For services to Local Government and the community in North West London.
- William Leslie Weller. For services to Chichester Cathedral and to the Arts in West Sussex.
- Edward Jeremy West. For services to the Funeral Profession Industry and to the community in Barking and Dagenham, Essex.
- Dr. Theodore Paul Weston, General Practitioner, Cumbria. For services to Victims of Trauma.
- Jane Rachael, Mrs. Whetnall, Co-Founder, Cheshire Academy of Integrated Sports and Arts. For services to Disability Sport.
- Christopher John Whitmey. For services to the Hereford Diocese including Education in South Wye in Herefordshire.
- Matthew David Whittington, Senior Executive Officer, Ministry of Defence. For services to Helicopter Operational Safety.
- Grace, Mrs. Wilcox, Administrative Officer, Customs, International Trade and Excise, Uxbridge. For services to Tax Compliance and voluntary service through The Prince's Trust.
- Ms Lesley Carol Wilkinson, Programme Manager, Families First, Leeds City Council. For services to Children and Families.
- Councillor Geoffrey Williams, Councillor, Basildon Borough Council. For service to Local Government.
- Marilyn, Mrs. Williams, lately Radiology Directorate Manager and Assistant Director of Therapies and Health Science, Aneurin Bevan Health Board. For services to Radiology and Healthcare.
- Mary Margaret, Mrs. Williams, Founder, North Wales Superkids. For charitable services to Disadvantaged Children in North Wales.
- Roy Williams, Engineer and Equipment Examiner, Ministry of Defence. For services to Defence Engineering.
- Richard John Willmott, Chief Immigration Officer, Border Force, Home Office. For services to the UK through the UK Watchlist.
- Eric George Wilson, National Constitutional Officer, Labour Party. For political service.
- Rabbi Mark Leonard Winer. For services to Interfaith Dialogue and to Social Cohesion in London and the UK.
- Prudence Mary, Mrs. Winton, President, West Worcestershire Conservative Association. For voluntary political service.
- Jean Lilian, Mrs. Wolstenholme. For services to Children and Young People in Lancashire.
- Miss Janette Mary Wood, Physical Education Teacher and Sports Partnership Manager, Freman College, Hertfordshire. For services to Education.
- David Alan Wright, lately Flight Data Monitoring Specialist, Civil Aviation Authority. For services to Aviation Safety.
- Malcolm Charles Wright, Watch Officer, H.M. Coastguard. For services to Her Majesty's Coastguard.
- Miss Anne Yates, Executive Officer, Work Services Directorate, Department for Work and Pensions. For services to Jobseekers and the community in Bolton.

=== British Empire Medal (BEM) ===
Military Division

Civil Division

- Danny Lawrence
- Michael Beck, for voluntary fundraising for Salisbury District Hospital Stars Appeal
- Stuart Russell, for voluntary service to the arts in Fife.

=== Queen's Police Medal (QPM) ===
Ribbon bar of the Queen's Police Medal for Merit, as awarded for Distinguished Service

England and Wales

- John Ahmed Anwar, Constable, Derbyshire Constabulary.
- Helen Elizabeth Ball, Deputy Assistant Commissioner, Metropolitan Police Service.
- Simon Peter Cole, Chief Constable, Leicestershire Constabulary.
- Maxine Julie De Brunner, Deputy Assistant Commissioner, Metropolitan Police Service.
- Neil Evans, Chief Superintendent, West Midlands Police.
- Neil Fowler, lately Detective Sergeant, Lancashire Constabulary.
- Martyn Hillier, lately Constable, Gloucestershire Constabulary.
- Philip Andrew Jordan, Chief Superintendent, Metropolitan Police Service.
- Akra Mullah Khan, Chief Superintendent, Nottinghamshire Police.
- Simon Parr, Chief Constable, Cambridgeshire Constabulary.
- Peter Christian Rickards, Detective Constable, Greater Manchester Police.
- Garry Scott Shewan, Assistant Chief Constable, Greater Manchester Police.
- Deborah Simpson, Chief Constable, Dorset Police.
- Eric Stephen Stuart, Sergeant, Metropolitan Police Service
- John Michael Francis Sweeney, Detective Superintendent, Metropolitan Police Service.
- David Thompson, Deputy Chief Constable, West Midlands Police.
- Christopher Derek Weigh, Deputy Chief Constable, Lancashire Constabulary.
- Michael Andrew Wise, Chief Superintendent, Metropolitan Police Service.

Scotland

- Robert Hamilton, Chief Superintendent, Police Scotland.
- Jeanette McDiarmid, Chief Superintendent, Police Scotland.
- Peter Roderick Smith, Special Constable, Police Scotland.

Northern Ireland

- Alan Kenneth Little, Temporary Detective Chief Inspector, Police Service of Northern Ireland.
- Gary Stephen McClure, Detective Inspector, Police Service of Northern Ireland.
- Jeffrey Carson McCready, lately Detective Inspector, Police Service of Northern Ireland.

=== Queen's Fire Service Medal (QFSM) ===
Ribbon bar of the Queen's Fire Service Medal for Merit, as awarded for Distinguished Service

England and Wales

- Peter Dartford, chief fire officer, Staffordshire Fire and Rescue Service.
- John Hindmarch, chief fire officer, Tyne and Wear Fire and Rescue Service.
- Lee Howell, chief fire officer, Devon and Somerset Fire and Rescue Service.
- Christopher Kenny, chief fire officer, Lancashire Fire and Rescue Service.
- Simon Pilling, chief fire officer, West Yorkshire Fire and Rescue Service.
- Frank Swann, chief fire officer, Nottinghamshire Fire and Rescue Service.

Scotland

- (Thomas) Kevin Blair, Retained Watch Manager, Scottish Fire and Rescue Service.
- David Farries, Watch Manager, Scottish Fire and Rescue Service.

=== Queen's Ambulance Service Medal (QAM) ===
Ribbon bar of the Queen's Ambulance Service Medal for Merit, as awarded for Distinguished Service

England and Wales

- Richard Michael Hook, Advanced Paramedic Practitioner – Welsh Ambulance Services NHS Trust.
- Andrew Jenkins, Consultant Paramedic – Welsh Ambulance Services NHS Trust.
- Anthony Christopher Marsh, chief executive officer– West Midlands Ambulance Service Trust.
- Jill Moseley, lately Associate Director of Clinical Quality – East of England Ambulance Service NHS Trust.

Scotland

- James Dickie, Head of Service (Forth Valley) – Scottish Ambulance Service.

=== Queen's Volunteer Reserves Medal (QVRM) ===
Ribbon bar of the Queen's Volunteer Reserves Medal

Royal Navy

- Lieutenant Duncan Reginald Hawkins – Royal Naval Reserve.
- Warrant Officer Class 1 Paul Hurlow – Royal Naval Reserve.

Army

- Warrant Officer Class 2 Paul Lydell Alwyn Brownlee – The Parachute Regiment, Army Reserve.
- Colonel Alastair James Cooper TD – late Royal Monmouthshire Royal Engineers (Militia), Army Reserve.
- Captain Patricia Ann Katherine Johnston – The Royal Logistic Corps, Army Reserve.
- Sergeant (Acting Colour Sergeant) Anselmo Ochello – The Royal Gibraltar Regiment, Army Reserve.
- Major Keith Steven Watkins TD – Queen Alexandra's Royal Army Nursing Corps, Army Reserve.

Air Force

- Squadron Leader Stuart John Sayer Talton – Royal Auxiliary Air Force.

=== Diplomatic Service and Overseas List ===
==== Order of the British Empire ====
===== Members of the Order of the British Empire (MBE) =====
- Carl Gary Salisbury. British Honorary Consul, Zanzibar, Tanzania. For services to British interests in Zanzibar.

=== Overseas Territories Police Medal ===
Ribbon bar of the Overseas Territories Police Medal for Merit, as awarded for Meritorious Service

- Albert Buhagiar, Sergeant, Royal Gibraltar Police.
- Richard Mifsud, Superintendent, Royal Gibraltar Police.
- Sergio Parody, Divisional Fire Officer, Gibraltar City Fire Brigade.
- Herbert Warwick, Constable, Royal Gibraltar Police.

== Crown Dependencies ==
=== The Most Excellent Order of the British Empire ===
==== Officer of the Order of the British Empire (OBE) ====
Civil
Jersey

Pamela Bell, philanthropy and charitable services in Jersey

==== Member of the Order of the British Empire (MBE) ====
Guernsey

- Sarah Elizabeth Griffith, for charitable works in Sri Lanka and Haiti

Jersey

- Clive Barton, for services to the community in Jersey
- Edward Le Quesne, for services to the community in Jersey

Isle of Man

- Peter Mark Shimmin, for services to the Isle of Man Government and Economy

=== British Empire Medal (BEM) ===
Guernsey

- Jane Rosemary Le Conte, for services to the community in Guernsey

Jersey

- Rosemary Blampied for her services to the community

Isle of Man

- Michal John Kewley, for services to local government and to the community

== Cook Islands ==
Below are the individuals appointed by Elizabeth II in her right as Queen of New Zealand, on advice of the Cook Islands Government.

=== Order of the British Empire ===
==== Officers of the Order of the British Empire (OBE) ====
- William John Hosking. For services to the public and community.

==== Members of the Order of the British Empire (MBE) ====
- Jon Tikivanotau Michael Jonassen. For services to Cook Islands culture and the Public Service.

=== British Empire Medal (BEM) ===
- Manila Matenga. For services to the Public Service and community.
- Vaine Noopuapii Teao. For services to the community.

== Barbados ==
Below are the individuals appointed by Elizabeth II in her right as Queen of Barbados, on advice of the Barbadian Government.

=== Order of the British Empire ===
==== Dames Commander of the Order of the British Empire (DBE) ====
- The Honourable Maizie Irene Barker-Welch. For services to national, regional and international advocation for the rights of women.

== Solomon Islands ==
Below are the individuals appointed by Elizabeth II in her right as Queen of the Solomon Islands, on advice of the Solomon Islands Government.

=== Order of Saint Michael and Saint George ===
==== Knight Commander of the Order of St Michael and St George (KCMG) ====
- Paul Joshua Tovua. For services to politics and to the community.

==== Companions of the Order of St Michael and St George (CMG) ====
- Alfred John Robert Scholz. For services to the Scouting Movement, the community and to economic development.

=== Order of the British Empire ===
==== Officers of the Order of the British Empire (OBE) ====
- Ted Nelson Kohia Aheria. For services to culture and to the community.
- Robert Au Nama. For services to the Arts.
- John Maxwell Harunari. For Public Service in the area of agriculture.
- Joe Poraiwai. For Public Service.

==== Members of the Order of the British Empire (MBE) ====
- Dick Daoleni. For services to politics both national and local, the private sector and the community.
- Kenneth John Grossmith. For services to Architecture and to the community.
- Mathew Edward Maefai. For Public Service.
- Ishmael Idu Misalo. For services to the Church and to the community.

=== British Empire Medal (BEM) ===
- Heather Pana. For services to the Health sector.

== Tuvalu ==
Below are the individuals appointed by Elizabeth II in her right as Queen of Tuvalu, on advice of the Tuvalu Government.

=== Order of the British Empire ===
==== Officer of the Order of the British Empire (OBE) ====
- Maatia Toafa. For Public and Community Service.

==== Member of the Order of the British Empire (MBE) ====
- The Reverend Tofiga Vaevalu Falani. For Public and Community Service.
- Palekiau Lepa. For Public and Community Service.
- Motulu Pedro. For Public and Community Service.

=== British Empire Medal (BEM) ===
- Teiloga Limoni. For Public and Community Service.
- Siluano Malaga. For Public and Community Service.
- Kepasi Tefau. For Public and Community Service.

== Saint Lucia ==
Below are the individuals appointed by Elizabeth II in her right as Queen of Saint Lucia, on advice of the Saint Lucia Government.

=== Order of Saint Michael and Saint George ===
==== Knight Commander of the Order of Saint Michael and Saint George (KCMG) ====
- The Honourable Dr Julian Robert Hunte, OBE. For services to the public and private sector in St. Lucia, and to the Commonwealth Caribbean community.

== Saint Vincent and Grenadines ==
Below are the individuals appointed by Elizabeth II in her right as Queen of Saint Vincent and the Grenadines, on advice of the Vincentian Government.

=== Order of Saint Michael and Saint George ===
==== Knight Commander of the Order of Saint Michael and Saint George (KCMG) ====
- Errol Newton Fitzrose Allen. For services to Banking and Financial Services.

==== Companion of the Order of Saint Michael and Saint George (CMG) ====
- Bishop Benjamin Alick Augustas Samuel. For services to the Christian Ministry and to the Community.

=== Order of the British Empire ===
==== Officer of the Order of the British Empire (OBE) ====
- Douglas Mc Gregor Brisbane. For services to Business, Horticulture and for Community Services.
- Robert Otway Linsdell Haydock. For services to Banking, Insurance and to Civil Society.

==== Member of the Order of the British Empire (MBE) ====
- Michael Fitz-Gerald Charles. For services to Policing, National Security, and Law and Order.
- Mona Issa Dare. For services to Business, Retail Trade and for Community Services.
- Faez Moussa. For services to Business, Retail Trade and to Community Services.

== Belize ==
Below are the individuals appointed by Elizabeth II in her right as Queen of Belize, on advice of the Belizean Government.

=== Order of the British Empire ===
==== Officer of the Order of the British Empire (OBE) ====
- Dr Adrian Alexander Coye. For services to medicine.
- Rafael Manzanero. For services to environmental protection.

==== Member of the Order of the British Empire (MBE) ====
- Rodney Harold Neal. For public service.

== Antigua and Barbuda ==
Below are the individuals appointed by Elizabeth II in her right as Queen of Antigua and Barbuda, on advice of the Antiguan and Barbudan Government.

=== Order of Saint Michael and Saint George ===
==== Companion of the Order of Saint Michael and Saint George (CMG) ====
- Lieutenant Colonel Edward H. Croft, OBE. For services to Youth and to National Security.

=== Order of the British Empire ===
==== Officer of the Order of the British Empire (OBE) ====
- Dr Radcliffe Alexander Robins. For Public Service, particularly in the field of Veterinarian Medicine.

==== Member of the Order of the British Empire (MBE) ====
- Dr David Montgomery King. For Public Service in the field of Education.
- Romona Small. For Public Service.

== Saint Kitts and Nevis ==
Below are the individuals appointed by Elizabeth II in her right as Queen of Saint Kitts and Nevis, on advice of the Kittian and Nevisian Government.

=== Order of the British Empire ===
==== Commander of the Order of the British Empire (CBE) ====
- Joseph Llewellyn Edmeade. For Public Service.

==== Officer of the Order of the British Empire (OBE) ====
- Errol Alphonsus Llewellyn Maynard. For Public Service.

==== Member of the Order of the British Empire (MBE) ====
- Osmond Stanley Petty. For Public Service.
- Veronica Elaine Phillip. For services to Education.

== Collated lists ==
- United Kingdom:
  - HM Government (30 December 2013). "New Year's Honours lists 2014" (PDF). Honours Lists. Cabinet Office and Foreign Office.
