= Ian Gray =

Ian Gray (or similar) may refer to:

- Ian Gray (runner) (born 1963), Belizean Olympic athlete
- Ian Gray (English footballer) (born 1975), English former football goalkeeper
- Ian Gray (soccer) (1963–2010), Australian football player
- Ian Gray (Australian magistrate), Chief Magistrate of the Magistrates' Court of Victoria
- Ian Gray (comics) (1938–2007), British comics writer and editor
- Ian Gray (actor), appeared in Pickwick (1969)
- Ian Campbell-Gray (1901–1946), British soldier
- Ian Grey (1918–1996), New Zealand historian
- Ian Grey (rugby league) (1931–2009), New Zealand rugby league player
- Iain Gray (born 1957), Scottish Labour politician
- Iain Gilmour Gray, British engineer and academic
