= Alison Carnwath =

British businesswoman (born 1953)

Dame Alison Carnwath DBE
- Born: Alison Jane Carnwath; January 1953 (age 73)
- Education: University of Reading
- Occupations: former Chairman, Land Securities
- Board member of: Zurich Insurance Paccar BASF BP and Livingbridge

Dame Alison Jane Carnwath DBE (born January 1953) is a British businesswoman, and former chairman of Land Securities.

== Early life and education ==
Alison Jane Carnwath was born in January 1953. She received a bachelor's degree in economics and German from the University of Reading in 1975.

== Career ==
=== Executive ===
Carnwath began her career with Peat Marwick Mitchell, now KPMG, where she qualified and practiced as a chartered accountant from 1975 to 1980.

She then moved into corporate finance. She worked from 1980 to 1982 at Lloyds Bank International, and from 1982 to 1993 at J. Henry Schroder Wagg & Co in London and New York. In 1993 she became a senior partner at the financial advisory firm Phoenix Partnership. The firm was taken over by Donaldson, Lufkin & Jenrette (DLJ) in late 1997; she continued working for DLJ until 2000.

=== Non-executive ===
Carnwath has held several board roles. These have included Vitec Group plc (as chair), Welsh Water, Friends Provident plc, Gallaher Group, MF Global Inc (as chair), Barclays, Man Group plc, Land Securities Group plc (as chair), UK private equity firm Livingbridge (as chair), Zurich Insurance, Paccar, BASF, and BP (she resigned from BP 'for personal and professional reasons' in January 2021).

She is also a senior advisor to Evercore Partners.

== Honours ==
She was created a Dame Commander of the Order of the British Empire in the 2014 New Year Honours for her services to business.
