= Penny Power =

British author and businesswoman (1901 – 1991)

Penny Power OBE (born 1964) is a British author and speaker. In 1998, she and her husband, Thomas Power, founded Ecademy, an online business networking site.She later founded the Digital Youth Academy, which ran digital apprenticeship programmes for young people. She was appointed an Officer of the Order of the British Empire (OBE) in the 2014 New Year Honours for services to entrepreneurship in social and digital development.

== Ecademy ==
As of May 2011, shortly before its demise, the Ecademy community had 3011 paying members, although Power claims a membership of 650,000. In 2012, Ecademy was acquired by SunZu, owned by Lyndon Wood.

Penny Power published a book in August 2009, titled Know Me, Like Me, Follow Me: What Online Social Networking Means for You and Your Business.

She subsequently published Business is Personal.

== Bibliography ==
- Power, Thomas; Power, Penny; Coote, Andy (2006). A Friend in Every City: One Global Family – A Networking Vision for the Twenty First Century. Ecademy Press. ISBN 978-0-9545093-7-8.
- Power, Penny; Power, Thomas (2009). Know Me, Like Me, Follow Me: What Online Social Networking Means for You and Your Business. Headline. ISBN 978-0-7553-1951-0.
- Power, Penny (2019). Business Is Personal: Be the Leader of Your Life and Business. Rethink Press. ISBN 978-1-78452-152-3.
- Contributor to Success Secrets for Wellbeing (Rethink Press, 2022) and Success Secrets for Living with AI (Candy Jar Books, 2025).

== Honours ==
Power was appointed Officer of the Order of the British Empire (OBE) in the 2014 New Year Honours for services to entrepreneurship in social and digital development.BBC News listed her among the technology-sector figures recognised in that year's honours.

== See also ==
- Business networking
