= Moira Whyte =

Scottish physician

Dame Moira Whyte DBE FRSE FMedSci
- Born: Moira Katherine Brigid Whyte; 25 September 1959 (age 66)
- Education: St Bartholomew's Hospital Medical College
- Scientific career
- Fields: Respiratory medicine
- Workplaces: University of Edinburgh; University of Sheffield

Dame Moira Katherine Brigid Whyte (born 25 September 1959) is a Scottish physician and medical researcher who is the Sir John Crofton Professor of Respiratory Medicine at the University of Edinburgh. She was the Director the Medical Research Council Centre for Inflammation Research and was Vice-Principal and Head of the College of Medicine and Veterinary Medicine at the University of Edinburgh. Whyte is also a trustee of Cancer Research UK.

== Early life and education ==
Moira Katherine Brigid Whyte was born on 25 September 1959. Her parents are Maurice and Anne Whyte. She was educated at Plymouth's Convent of Notre Dame, and, later, Plymouth College. She then went on to study medicine at St Bartholomew's Hospital Medical College. She worked and studied at Hammersmith Hospital, Royal Postgraduate Medical School and Imperial Cancer Research Fund. Whyte completed clinical fellowships funded by the Medical Research Council and Wellcome Trust.

== Career and research ==
Whyte became Professor of Respiratory Medicine at the University of Sheffield in 1996, subsequently becoming Head of the Department of Infection and Immunity. In 2014 Whyte moved to become the Professor of Respiratory Medicine at the University of Edinburgh and in 2016, Whyte became Head of the University of Edinburgh Medical School succeeding John Iredale, having become Director of the MRC University of Edinburgh Centre for Inflammation Research in 2015.

Whyte was previously an honorary officer and Registrar of the Academy of Medical Sciences from 2012 to 2016. Whyte is active in the Medical Research Council as the Chair of their Clinical Training and Careers Panel and was formerly a Member of the Medical Research Council Population and Systems Medicine Board and was also Deputy Chair of the Medical Research Council/National Institute for Health Research Efficacy and Mechanisms Evaluation Board.

In April 2018, Whyte took up the position of Vice-Principal and Head of the College of Medicine and Veterinary Medicine. She succeeded Professor Sir John Savill in this role. Whyte was succeeded by David Argyle in 2022.

In 2020, Whyte was appointed a trustee of Cancer Research UK.

== Awards and honours ==
Whyte was appointed Officer of the Order of the British Empire for services to respiratory medicine in the 2014 New Year Honours and a Dame Commander of the same order in the 2024 Birthday Honours. In 2018, she was elected a Fellow of the Royal Society of Edinburgh and is also a Fellow of the Academy of Medical Sciences.
