= Michael Hayman =

- Born: 3 January 1970 (age 56)
- Occupation: Businessman

Michael Morris Hayman MBE DL (born 3 January 1970) is an entrepreneur, broadcaster and author in the United Kingdom. He is a co-founder of Seven Hills, a London-based campaigning communication consultancy. Michael is chairman of Entrepreneurs at the private bank Coutts & Co, Chairs GRADVenture, the University of London Entrepreneur Pitch and serves on the Advisory Council of the Royal Philharmonic Orchestra.

He is Honorary Professor of the Purpose Economy at the University of London where he also holds an Honorary Doctorate, is an Honorary Fellow at the University of Cambridge Judge Business School Centre for Entrepreneurial Learning and he is an advisory board member of the School of Business & Management, Queen Mary University of London.

Hayman is co-author of 'Mission: How the Best in Business Break Through’ published by Penguin Random House in July 2015. He hosts the podcast Change Makers, the London Live tv show Capital Conversation and is a regular columnist for City AM, Country & Town House, and the Yorkshire Post.

He was one of co-founders of StartUp Britain, the national initiative for early stage enterprise, which was fully supported by the then Prime Minister David Cameron and HM Government. Hayman was appointed Member of the Order of the British Empire (MBE) in the 2014 New Year Honours for services to enterprise, promotion, entrepreneurship, and education and is a Deputy Lieutenant for the county of Surrey and is a Freeman of the City of London.

In March 2026, Hayman was elected Chair of the British Chambers of Commerce by its board, succeeding Sarah Howard MBE who had served in the role for six and a half years. As Chair, he leads the strategic direction of a network representing 51 accredited UK Chambers and 75 international Chambers.

== StartUp Britain ==
As an advocate of entrepreneurship, Michael Hayman is a co-founder of StartUp Britain, a campaign by entrepreneurs for entrepreneurs, which was launched in 2011 by the prime minister David Cameron, the chancellor George Osborne and the secretary of state for business Vince Cable in response to the government's call for an 'enterprise-led' recovery.

== Publications ==
Hayman is co-author of 'Mission: How the Best in Business Break Through’ published by Penguin Random House in July 2015. He hosts the podcast Change Makers, the London Live tv show Capital Conversation and is a regular columnist for City AM, Country & Town House, and the Yorkshire Post. Hayman has also written as enterprise columnist for The Daily Telegraph and Real Business and has written thought leadership reports for UK Trade & Invest, Central London Forward and the City of Westminster. He has authored or co-authored the following reports:

- Disruptive Influence : The Entrepreneurs Report – Virgin Media Pioneers
- Face Value: Your Reputation As A Business Asset – Coutts & Co

== Public profile ==
Hayman has supported the national enterprise effort, assisting the Department for Business to position Business in You, StartUp Loans and the Seed Enterprise Investment Scheme.

Born in Sheffield, Hayman has taken a keen interest in the fortunes of the city. He has served on the board of the regeneration agency Creative Sheffield and co-founded Made: The Entrepreneur Festival in 2010.

He sits on the management board of the Business School Small Business Charter. Michael is a member of Edinburgh Festivals. He also served as a non-executive director with the city of Westminster (Westco) and as a commissioner on the Finance Inquiry into The Future of Cities and a board member for National Business Awards.
