= Graham Jukes =

Graham Michael Jukes OBE
- Citizenship: British
- Known for: pest control institutional leadership
- Awards: Officer of the Most Excellent Order of the British Empire
- Scientific career
- Fields: Environmental Health
- Institutions: Chartered Institute of Environmental Health

Graham Michael Jukes OBE is a British practitioner of environmental health and a senior executive. He is best known for his leadership of the Chartered Institute of Environmental Health where he served as Executive Director from 2000 through 2014.

Jukes began his career in local government in 1971. He was appointed Under Secretary of CIEH in 1988, later as director of Professional Services, and in 2000 he was appointed chief executive of the organization. In 2014, Jukes announced his retirement from CIEH.

Throughout his career of more than 43 years, Jukes was instrumental in a number of landmark publications, including: Public Health Significance of Urban Pests, published by the World Health Organization in 2008; and Putting Wrong Things Right: Environmental Health, 1952-2012, published by CIEH in 2014.

Jukes was elected a Fellow of the CIEH in 1990, a Fellow of the Faculty of Public Health in 2004, and he was invested as an Officer of the Most Excellent Order of the British Empire in 2014.
