= Iain Gilmour Gray =

Sir Iain Gilmour Gray CBE FRSE FREng (born 22 March 1957) is a British engineer and academic, who worked as Professor and Director of Aerospace at Cranfield University from 2015 to 2024.

Gray worked for British Aerospace from graduation in 1979 until 2007, including as managing director of Airbus UK for the final three years, before transferring to government service as the first chief executive officer of the Technology Strategy Board (later Innovate UK"). Before he left for Cranfield, Gray was appointed Commander of the Order of British Empire in the 2014 New Year Honours "for services to Science, Technology and Innovation".

Gray was knighted in the 2023 Birthday Honours "for services to the Aerospace Industry".

In October 2025 he was inducted into the Scottish Engineering Hall of Fame.
