= Robin Eady =

British dermatologist

Robin Eady

Robin Anthony Jeffrey Eady MBE FMedSci (29 November 1940 - 2 August 2017) was a British dermatologist and the world's longest surviving kidney patient after receiving dialysis from the 1960s.
