= Doreen Cantrell =

British immunologist

Professor Doreen Cantrell CBE FRS FRSE FMedSci
- Education: University College of Wales, Aberystwyth; University of Nottingham
- Scientific career
- Fields: immunology
- Workplaces: University of Dundee
- Thesis: Membrane markers on rat cytotoxic cells (1982)
- Website: Profile

Doreen Ann Cantrell (born 1957) is a British scientist and Professor of Cellular Immunology at the School of Life Sciences, University of Dundee. She researches the development and activation T lymphocytes, which are key to the understanding the immune response.

== Education ==
Cantrell received her bachelor's degree in zoology in 1979 from the University College of Wales, Aberystwyth, and her PhD in Immunology in the Cancer Research Campaign Laboratory at the University of Nottingham.

== Career ==
Cantrell made her first major contribution to the field in 1984, when she and Dr. Kendall A. Smith published the first single cell analysis of lymphocyte proliferation.

From 1987 to 2002, she was Head of the Lymphocyte Activation Laboratory at the Cancer Research UK London Research Institute. In 2002, she was awarded a Wellcome Trust Principal Research Fellowship at the School of Life Sciences at the University of Dundee. She has served as Chair of the UK Medical Research Council's Immunology and Infections panel (2010–14) and was a member of MRC council (2014–18). She is a member of the editorial board for Immunity.

She is an expert on the function of T lymphocytes, the white blood cells which control the immune system.

== Awards and honours ==
Cantrell was appointed Commander of the Order of the British Empire (CBE) in the 2014 New Year Honours for services to life sciences. She was elected a fellow of the Royal Society in 2011 for her work on immunology. She became a fellow of the Academy of Medical Sciences in 2000 and of The Royal Society of Edinburgh in 2005.

The University of Bath awarded Cantrell an Honorary Doctorate of Science in July 2017.
