= UWI Seismic Research Centre =

Trinidadian natural disaster research centre

- Founded: 1953; 73 years ago (as the Volcanological Research Department)
- Purpose: To monitor and study earthquakes, volcanoes and tsunamis in the Eastern Caribbean and provide advice and information to protect lives and livelihoods.
- Location: Saint Augustine, Trinidad and Tobago
- Key people: Pat Joseph, Director
- Affiliations: University of the West Indies
- Website: Official website

The University of the West Indies Seismic Research Centre (UWI-SRC) is a centre for volcanological, seismic and geophysical research in Trinidad and Tobago, which has the responsibility for monitoring and studying earthquakes, volcanoes and tsunamis across the Eastern Caribbean. Part of the University of the West Indies, it is also responsible for providing formal advice, and information, around the volcanic, seismic and tsunami hazards and events across the region, to reduce risk and protect lives and livelihoods. In recent years, UWI-SRC has managed ongoing volcanic unrest at the Soufriere Hills Volcano through the running of the Montserrat Volcano Observatory, and the 2020–2021 eruptions of La Soufrière on St Vincent.

== History ==
UWI-SRC was established in 1953, as the Volcanological Research Department of the Imperial College of Tropical Agriculture in Trinidad. In the early 1960s the department became the Seismic Research Unit of the University of the West Indies, and in 2008 was formally established as a research centre within the university, and took on the name Seismic Research Centre.

== Regional seismic network ==
UWI-SRC manages the largest network of seismometers in the Caribbean, extending across all of the islands of the English-speaking Caribbean, and seventeen known or active volcanoes. The origins of the modern network go back to the early 1950s, when geophysicist Patrick Willmore was sent by the British Colonial Office to investigate a seismic crisis on St Kitts and Nevis which had begun in late December 1950. Willmore arrived in February 1951, but soon realised he had already missed the most significant earthquakes of the crisis. To prevent this happening again, Willmore recommended that a regional network of instruments be established by placing one seismograph on 'each of the major British islands', with data collected at a central office. The first seismograph was installed in Trinidad; followed by others on St Vincent and Dominica, and by 1959 there were stations on eight islands. In 2022, the network extends to more than 60 stations.

Over time, the instruments used in the seismic network have changed radically. The first seismometers installed were analogue seismographs designed by Patrick Willmore, which recorded onto photographic paper. During the 1970s, radio-telemetry was introduced, so that signals could be transmitted from the analogue field stations, to the UWI-SRC headquarters. Tools were developed to digitise and time-stamp the analogue data, and then to record and process the digitised data using an in-house algorithm called "WurstMachine" to calculate the earthquake parameters: hypocentre and magnitude. The current generation of seismometers are fully digital, and networked so that they can stream data to UWI-SRC headquarters. The network includes both broadband, three-component and one-component instruments. Many of the seismic stations are co-located with other monitoring instruments (including accelerometers and continuous GPS receivers), and some are shared with regional monitoring agencies run by UNAVCO, IPGP and others.

== Directors ==
Directors of UWI-SRC include

- Geoffrey Robson
- John Tomblin (1968–1980)
- John Shepherd (1980–1989)
- Keith Rowley (1989–1991)
- Lloyd Lynch
- William Ambeh
- John Shepherd (1999–2004)
- Richard Robertson (2004–2011)
- Joan Latchman (2011–2013)
- Richard Robertson (2013–2019)
- Erouscilla Joseph (2019–)

== Awards ==
- 2022 Volcanic Surveillance and Crisis Management Award of the International Association of Volcanology and Chemistry of the Earth's Interior (IAVCEI)

== See also ==
- List of earthquakes in the Caribbean
- Caribbean Disaster Emergency Management Agency (CDEMA)
