= Richard Robertson =

Vulcanologist

Richard E. A. Robertson
- Born: Saint Vincent and the Grenadines
- Education: University of the West Indies; University of Leeds
- Scientific career
- Workplaces: University of the West Indies

Richard E. A. Robertson is a Professor of Geology and past Director of the University of the West Indies Seismic Research Centre. He studied Geology and Volcanology at Mona Campus of the University of the West Indies in Jamaica and Leeds University, United Kingdom.

== Early life and education ==
Robertson was born in Saint Vincent. He became interested in volcanology after waking up to the La Soufrière eruption on 1979. He studied geology at the University of the West Indies and graduated with a bachelor's degree in 1987. After graduating he was appointed Head of the Soufriere Monitoring Unit in St. Vincent. He moved to the United Kingdom for his graduate studies, and earned a master's degree in volcanology at Leeds. Robertson moved back to the UWI for his doctoral degree and completed a PhD in geology at the University of the West Indies in 2003. For his doctoral studies he worked on the volcanic geology of pre-Soufriere rocks in St. Vincent. He was part of the team who were first on the ground monitoring the Soufriere Hills Volcano. In 1995 he published a paper based on his Master's research that was the first risk assessment of La Soufriere volcano.

== Research and career ==
After six years leading the volcano-monitoring unit in St. Vincent, Robertson joined the staff of SRC in 1993. During the eruptions of Soufriere Hills Volcano, Montserrat, he served several tours of duty as Chief Scientist of the Montserrat Volcano Observatory from 1995–1999 and was Director from October 1998 – March 1999. He was appointed Director of the University of the West Indies Seismic Research Centre in 2008 and apart from a brief two year break from 2011–2013, he held this position until November 2019, when he was succeeded by Erouscilla (Pat) Joseph. As Director of SRC he secured grants from the United States Agency for International Development and Office of Foreign Disaster Assistance, as well as the Government of Trinidad and Tobago in order to develop a more robust monitoring network and enhance and diversity the education and outreach provided by the centre. In 2007 Robertson travelled to the University of Bristol supported by the Royal Commission for the Exhibition of 1851. Here he worked on geothermal fluid analysis using atomic absorption spectroscopy and ion chromatography. The Montserrat Volcano Observatory has been managed by Seismic Research Centre since 2008. He was promoted to Professor at the University of the West Indies in May 2017. Here he developed the volcanic hazard atlas of the Caribbean. He has been part of the large-scale NERC-funded STREVA and VOILA programmes. In 2018 he launched Volcano Ready, a project to help communities manage the impacts of the La Soufriere volcano of St. Vincent. Robertson played a key role along with the staff of SRC in managing the eruption of La Soufriere on St Vincent in 2021.

Robertson joined the crew aboard EV Nautilus in 2014. He took part in the Kick 'em Jenny Submarine Volcano Project, which was captained by expedition leader Katy Croff Bell. He has recently voiced his concern over whether Trinidad and Tobago is prepared for a strong earthquake.

Robertson has served as a consultant for UNESCO, the Organization of American States and the Foreign and Commonwealth Office. He is a member of the Trinidad and Tobago Environmental Commission. He was awarded the Anthony N Sabga Caribbean Awards for Excellence for science and technology in 2014.
