= Joan Latchman =

Seismologist from Trinidad and Tobago

Joan L. Latchman
- Born: Trinidad and Tobago
- Education: University of the West Indies
- Scientific career
- Workplaces: University of the West Indies; Montserrat Volcano Observatory; Seismic Research Centre

Joan L. Latchman is a seismologist from Trinidad and Tobago who was the first woman to lead the University of the West Indies Seismic Research Centre. She was awarded the 2019 Caribbean Disaster Emergency Management Agency Council Award.

== Early life and education ==
Latchman was born in Trinidad and Tobago around 1940. In 1972, shortly after completing her A-Levels, Latchman joined the University of the West Indies Seismic Research Centre as a technician. In 1977 she started a part-time undergraduate degree in natural sciences. She worked on the La Soufrière volcanic eruption with Keith Rowley in 1979 and worked at the Montserrat Volcano Observatory. In 1982, after an earthquake swarm that occurred in the vicinity of Tobago, Latchman became interested in seismicity. She worked with Frank Dale Morgan, a visiting academic from Massachusetts Institute of Technology who was working at the Seismic Research Centre. Her early work considered the development of simple microprocessors that could convert the acoustic recordings of seismic events into digital signals that can be analysed on a computer.

== Research and career ==
Latchman was selected to take part in the International Seismological Centre in 1988 and spent two years analysing global seismicity. She started a master's research project into the fault system of Tobago, and earned her degree in 1998. She joined the academic staff at the UWI in 1999 whilst working toward a doctorate in the Tobago and Earthquakes. She was eventually promoted to Director of the University of the West Indies Seismic Research Centre.

She was responsible for the collection of seismic data from fifty stations throughout the Eastern Caribbean. She has made efforts to communicate and better prepare people for seismic hazards in the West Indies. Latchman called for local governments to include earthquake preparation in their policy work, including considering their infrastructure, medical equipment preparation and enforcement of building codes.

Latchman retired from the UWI Seismic Research Centre in 2019. She was visited by Keith Rowley, her former colleague and now Prime Minister of Trinidad and Tobago. In 2019 Latchman was awarded the Caribbean Disaster Emergency Management Agency Council Award.

Alongside her research, Latchman is committed to public engagement and outreach. She has been involved in a photographic exhibition that explored the volcanic activity of Saint Vincent and the Grenadines. She routinely provided information about seismic activity to local and national newspapers.

=== Selected publications ===
Her publications include;

- Latchman, Joan L. (1998-09-15). "Seismicity associated with dome growth and collapse at the Soufriere Hills Volcano, Montserrat". Geophysical Research Letters. 25 (18): 3401–3404. Bibcode:1998GeoRL..25.3401M. doi:10.1029/98GL01778. S2CID 140567183.
- Latchman, Joan L. (1998-09-15). "Soufrière Hills Eruption, Montserrat, 1995–1997: Volcanic earthquake locations and fault plane solutions". Geophysical Research Letters. 25 (18): 3397–3400. Bibcode:1998GeoRL..25.3397A. doi:10.1029/98GL00858. S2CID 129796392.
- Latchman, Joan L. (2008). "Temporal changes in the cumulative piecewise gradient of a variant of the Gutenberg–Richter relationship, and the imminence of extreme events". Earth-Science Reviews. 87 (3–4): 94–112. Bibcode:2008ESRv...87...94L. doi:10.1016/j.earscirev.2007.11.001.
