= Latchman =

Latchman is a family and given name.

== Given name ==
- Latchman Bhansingh (born 1966), former Canadian international cricketer

== Surname ==
- David Latchman, (born 1956), British geneticist and university administrator
- Harry Latchman (born 1943), former English cricketer
- Joan Latchman, seismologist from Trinidad and Tobago
