= Plaine des Cafres =

Plateau on Réunion Island

Coordinates: 21°13′21″S 55°33′18″E

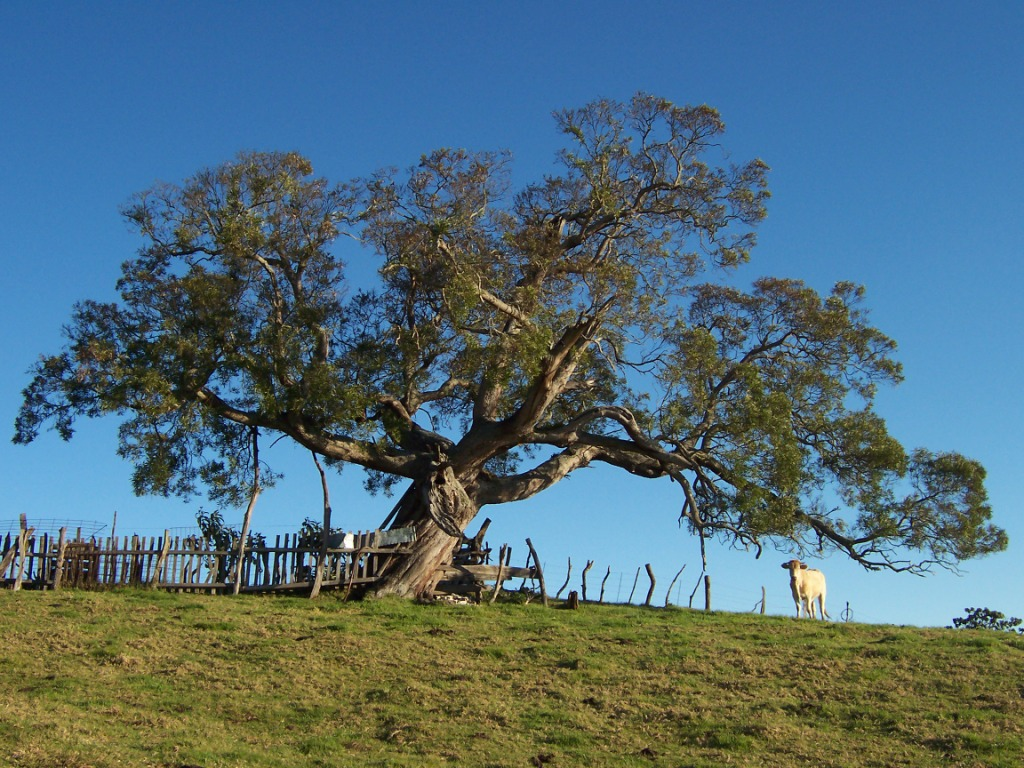
A cow sheltered under a highland tamarin on a meadow at Plaine des Cafres.

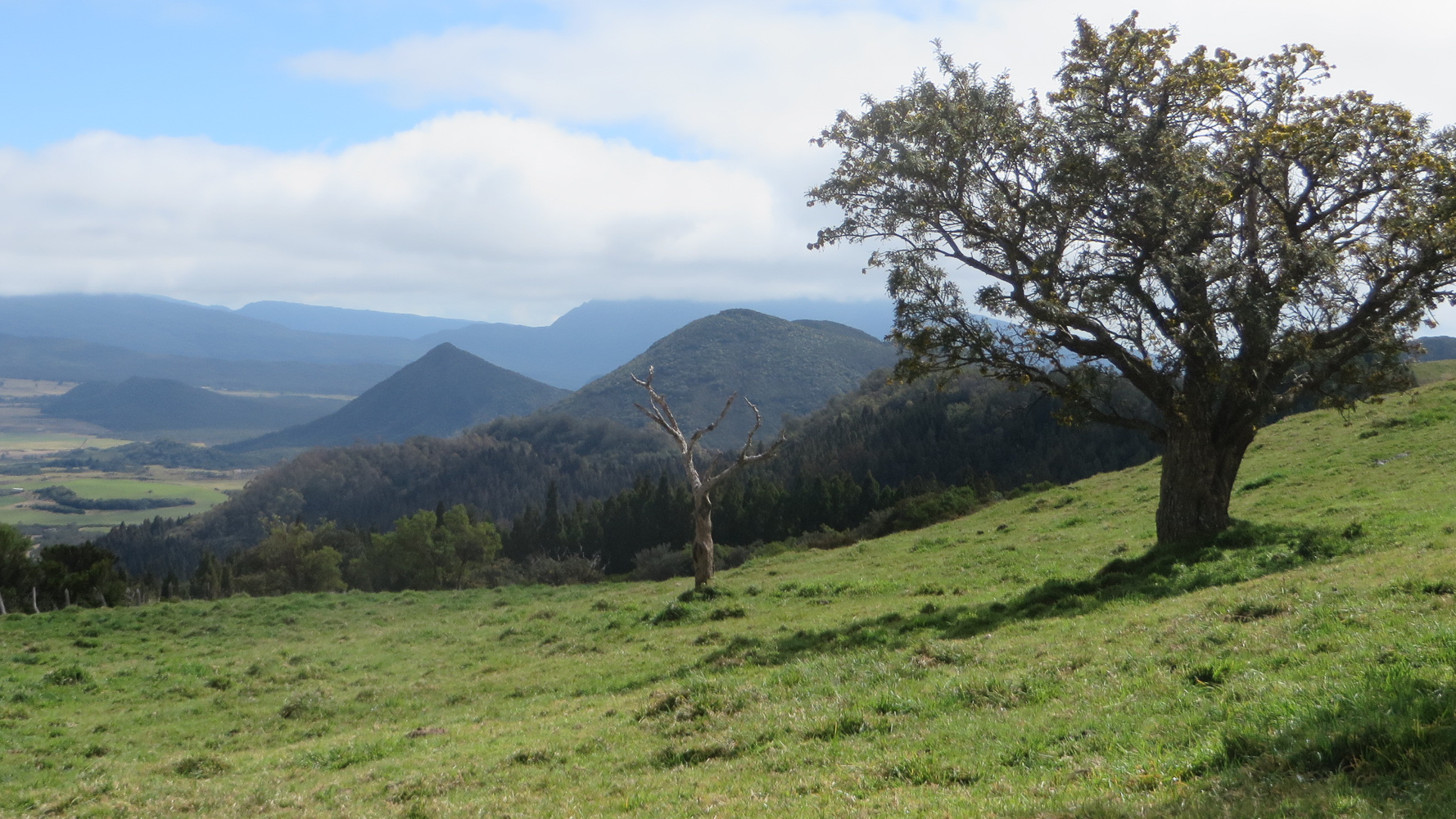
Viewed from RF5 showing small volcano cones in this valley

The Plaine des Cafres is a plateau on Réunion Island, one of the French volcanic islands in the Mascarene Archipelago in the southwestern Indian Ocean. It is part of the commune of Le Tampon.

It is named after the Cafres, black slaves who hid in the area during and before the 18th century.

== Geography ==
Located between the two mountain ranges of Piton des Neiges and Piton de la Fournaise, the Plaine des Cafres is separated from the commune of La Plaine-des-Palmistes by the col de Bellevue, a mountain pass culminating at 1630 m. The RF5 road leading to the Piton de la Fournaise volcano starts from the Plaine des Cafres.

== Economy ==
Due to abundant flat lands covered with meadows, bovine farming is well developed (most cattle grown on the island are at the Plaine des Cafres). The many cow pastures give the area an Alpine character.

== Infrastructures ==
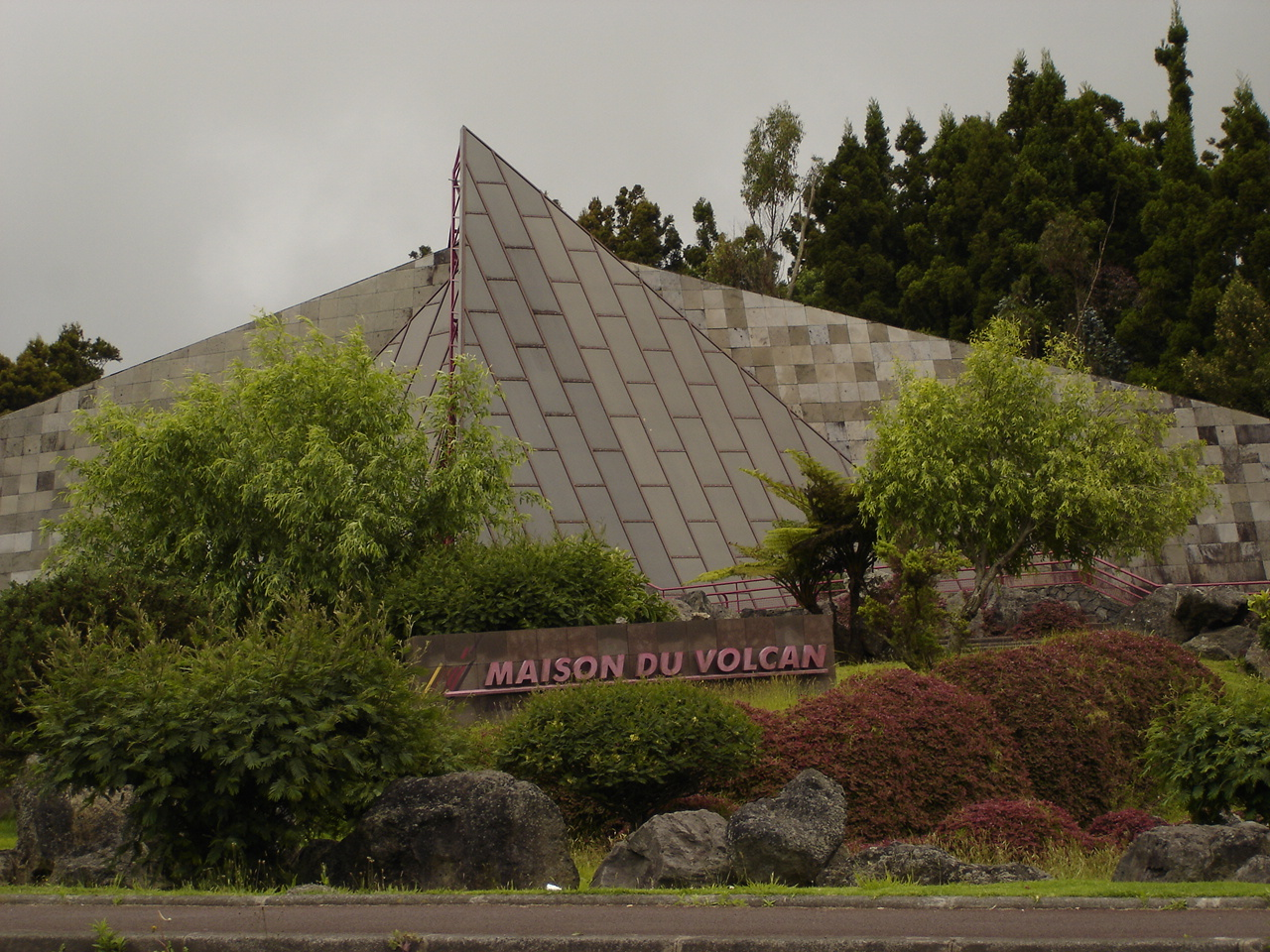
La Maison du Volcan, an interpretation centre on volcanos.

Since 1979, the Plaine des Cafres hosts the Piton de la Fournaise Volcano Observatory, and there is one collège.

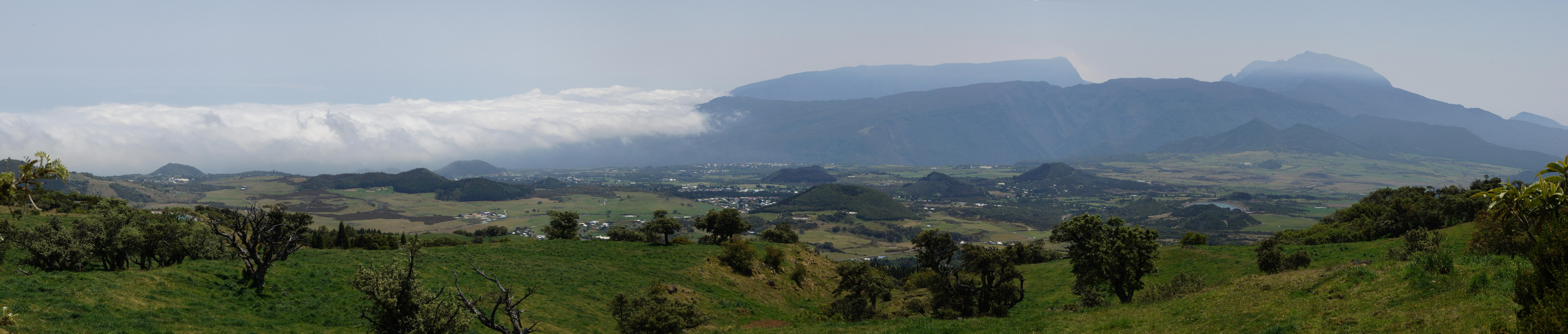
View of the Plaine des Cafres seen from RF5 road. In the background: the Piton des Neiges (right) and Grand Bénare (left).
