= Erouscilla Joseph =

Caribbean Volcanologist

- Education: University of the West Indies
- Scientific career
- Workplaces: University of the West Indies

Erouscilla "Pat" Joseph is a volcanologist, and Director of the University of the West Indies Seismic Research Centre, which oversees seismic and volcanic monitoring of the English-speaking Eastern Caribbean. She led the volcanological management of the 2021 La Soufriere eruptions on Saint Vincent, for which the Seismic Research Centre received global accolades.

== Biography ==
Joseph graduated from UWI St Augustine in 1999 with a BSc degree in Chemistry and Zoology. She went on to complete an MPhil in Chemistry in 2003. In 2008, Joseph was the first PhD graduate in volcanology from UWI, with a thesis titled "Geochemistry of Geothermal Systems in Saint Lucia and Dominica, Lesser Antilles: Implications for Volcanic Monitoring". Her thesis work included studies of the health-hazard impacts of volcanic gases on tourists at the Sulphur Springs Park, St Lucia; the world's only 'drive in' volcano. This work was recognised in 2018 by the Institute for Gender and Development Studies at UWI, as a celebration of '70+ Outstanding UWI Women', and she was named as " Trailblazer of Volcanology for Tourism."

== Career ==
Joseph has worked for the Seismic Research Centre since 2009. She was employed first as Research Fellow, and then as Director since 2019, succeeding Richard Robertson. Her particular expertise is the study of volcanic, hydrothermal and geothermal fluids, and she has published many papers on these topics. She has worked across many of the volcanic islands of the Eastern Caribbean, including St Vincent, Montserrat, St Lucia and Dominica, both in response to volcanic or seismic unrest, and to develop programmes of public outreach, education and information-sharing about hot springs, volcanoes, earthquakes and related phenomena. As Director of the Seismic Research Centre, Joseph led the emergency volcano management and crisis response to the 2021 eruptions of La Soufriere, St Vincent. In her role as Director, Joseph had a very significant media presence from the start of the crisis. The events on St Vincent continued to garner a lot of press coverage, as the volcanic eruption ramped up to a major sequence of explosions over the course of January - April 2021, and led to ash fallout across the St Vincent and Barbados. Joseph and the Seismic Research Centre were awarded the Volcano Surveillance and Crisis Management award by the International Association of Volcanology and Chemistry of Earth's Interior for their response to this eruption. Joseph was the lead author on the first scientific paper to describe the 2021 eruption, and the response to the events.
