= Volcano observatory =

Institution that monitors volcano activity

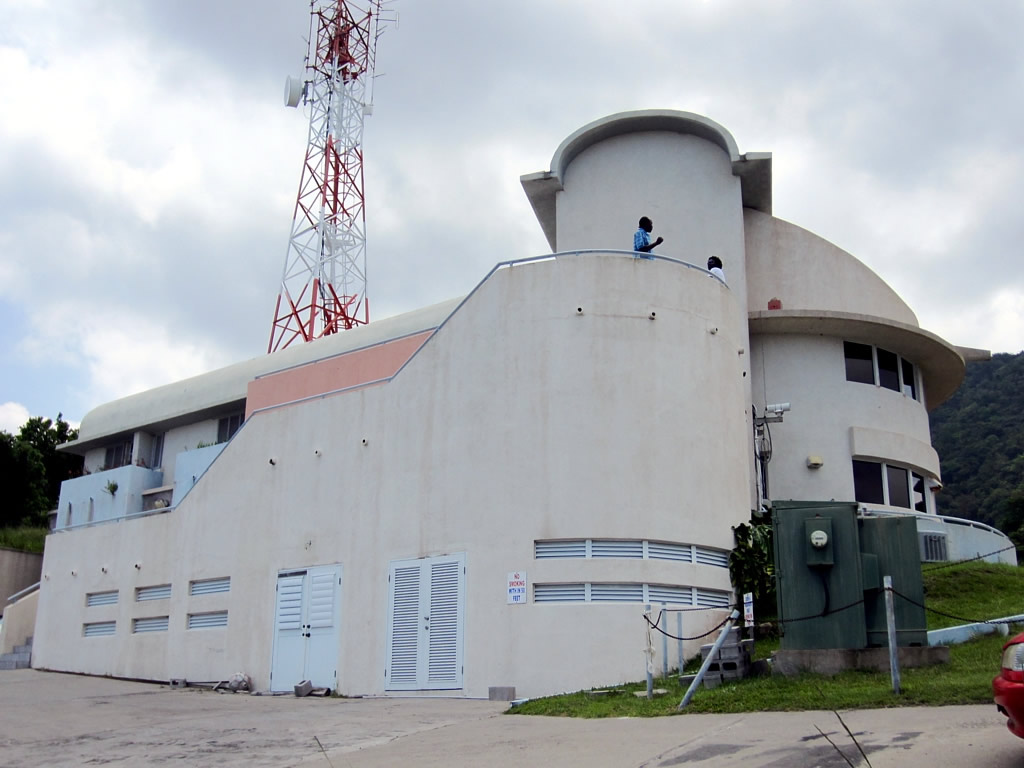
The Montserrat Volcano Observatory situated near the Soufrière Hills volcano

A volcano observatory is an institution that conducts research and monitoring of a volcano.

Each observatory provides continuous and periodic monitoring of the seismicity, other geophysical changes, ground movements, volcanic gas chemistry, and hydrologic conditions and activity between and during eruptions. They also provide a detailed record of eruptions in progress.

== Monitor ==
These observations serve to characterize eruptive behavior, identify the nature of precursory activity leading to eruption, define the processes by which different types of deposits are emplaced, and specify the hazards that could be unleashed by each kind of eruption. From direct observation of precursory signs, it is possible to anticipate eruptions. In times of volcanic unrest, observatories issue warnings and recommendations - they take on an advisory role for decision-making governmental civil defense agencies (the Federal Emergency Management Agency in the U.S. or the Protezione Civile in Italy) and ideally continue producing observational data.

Earthquakes Underlying all observatory operations is an ongoing program of fundamental research in volcanic processes, supplemented by collaborative studies with universities, government agencies (in the U.S. for instance with other US Geological Survey centers, and NOAA), industry and non-governmental organizations. Such research typically includes direct interpretation of the monitoring and eruption data, and it leads to formulation of conceptual models that can be tested by theoretical or laboratory simulations of volcanic systems.

Almost all observatories are members of the World Organization of Volcano Observatories (WOVO). The oldest volcano observatory is the Osservatorio Vesuviano (founded 1841) in Naples, now a member of the Italian government agency INGV.

== See also ==
- INGV Mt Etna Volcano Observatory
- INGV Vesuvius Observatory
- Kamchatka Volcanic Eruption Response Team
- Montserrat Volcano Observatory
- Philippine Institute of Volcanology and Seismology
- Piton de la Fournaise Volcano Observatory
- Southern Andean Volcano Observatory
- Volcanic Ash Advisory Center
- Volcano Hazards Program of the United States

- Alaska Volcano Observatory
- California Volcano Observatory
- Cascades Volcano Observatory
- Hawaiian Volcano Observatory
- Yellowstone Volcano Observatory
- Volcano warning schemes of the United States
