= Susan Loughlin =

British volcanologist

- Education: University of Leicester (BSc) University of Durham (PhD)
- Scientific career
- Workplaces: British Geological Survey

Susan Loughlin MBE is a British volcanologist. She was director of the Montserrat Volcano Observatory from 2004 to 2006, and has been head of volcanology for the British Geological Survey since 2008.

== Education ==
Loughlin graduated from the University of Leicester in 1991, with a BSc in geology. She then studied the geological evolution of the Eyjafjӧll Volcanic System in Iceland for her PhD at the University of Durham, supervised by Henry Emeleus and Bob Holdsworth. She submitted her thesis in 1995.

== Career ==
Loughlin joined the British Geological Survey straight after completing her PhD. Her initial role was within a team responsible for mapping volcanic rocks and deposits. In the meantime, the Soufrière Hills Volcano on the island of Montserrat had begun to erupt, and Loughlin spent the period from 1997 to 1999 as deputy chief scientist at the newly established Montserrat Volcano Observatory. Loughlin returned to Montserrat as director of the observatory from 2004 to 2006. This was a time of great uncertainty with the volcano reaching ten years of activity, and in her role as Director she was "arguably, the most important person in Montserrat". Since 2008, Loughlin has been head of volcanology for the British Geological Survey; and topic lead for risk reduction and resilience since 2020. Through these roles, Loughlin provides frequent technical expertise and advice to the UK Government, the UK Met Office and the UK Civil Aviation Authority both on the risks and impacts of volcanic eruptions, and the assessment of hazards from hydrometeorological, volcanic, animal, and human health events globally.

== Research ==
Loughlin has published extensively on volcanic deposits, processes and hazards, and in areas including volcanic hazards for the aviation industry, and best practices for the global volcano observatory community. In 2015, Loughlin was the lead author of a major reference book, "Global volcanic hazards and risk".

== Recognition ==
Loughlin has received significant recognition for her work during the Montserrat crisis, and during the Icelandic Eyjafjallajökull eruption of 2010, during which volcanic ash clouds had a major impact on aviation across Europe. In the UK New Year Honours List 2014, Loughlin was awarded an MBE for ‘Services to Volcanology’. In 2017, Loughlin was awarded the Thermo-Fisher award of the Volcanic and Magmatic Studies Group of the Geological Society of London for her 'significant contribution to our current understanding of volcanic and magmatic processes’.
