= Bourg-Murat =

Coordinates: 21°12′6″S 55°34′37″E

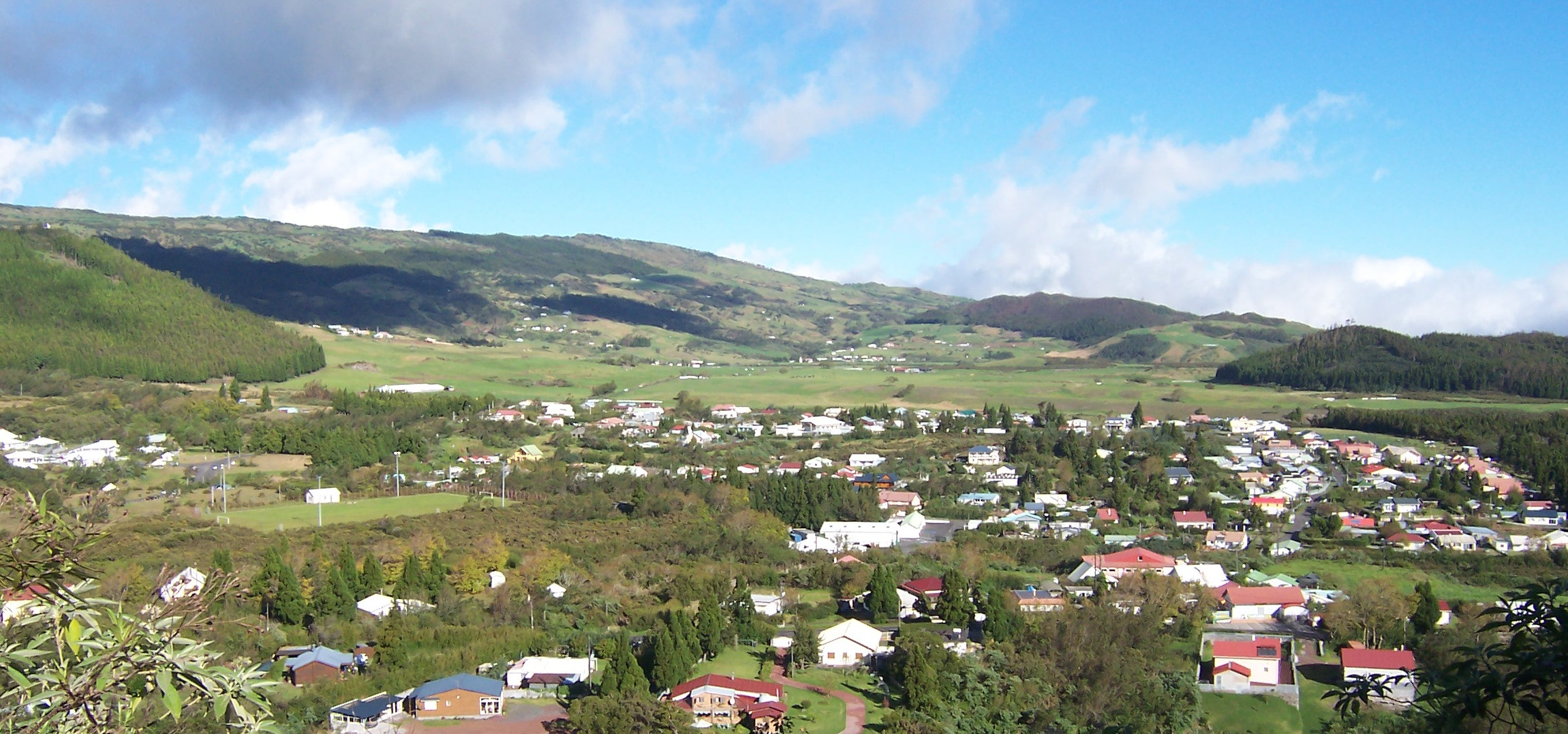
Bourg-Murat.

Bourg-Murat is a village on the Plaine des Cafres on the French island of Réunion, lying north east of Le Tampon. It has a museum dedicated to the nearby Piton de la Fournaise volcano and is home to the Piton de la Fournaise Volcano Observatory.
