= Piton de la Fournaise Volcano Observatory =

Coordinates: 21°12′31″S 55°34′19″E

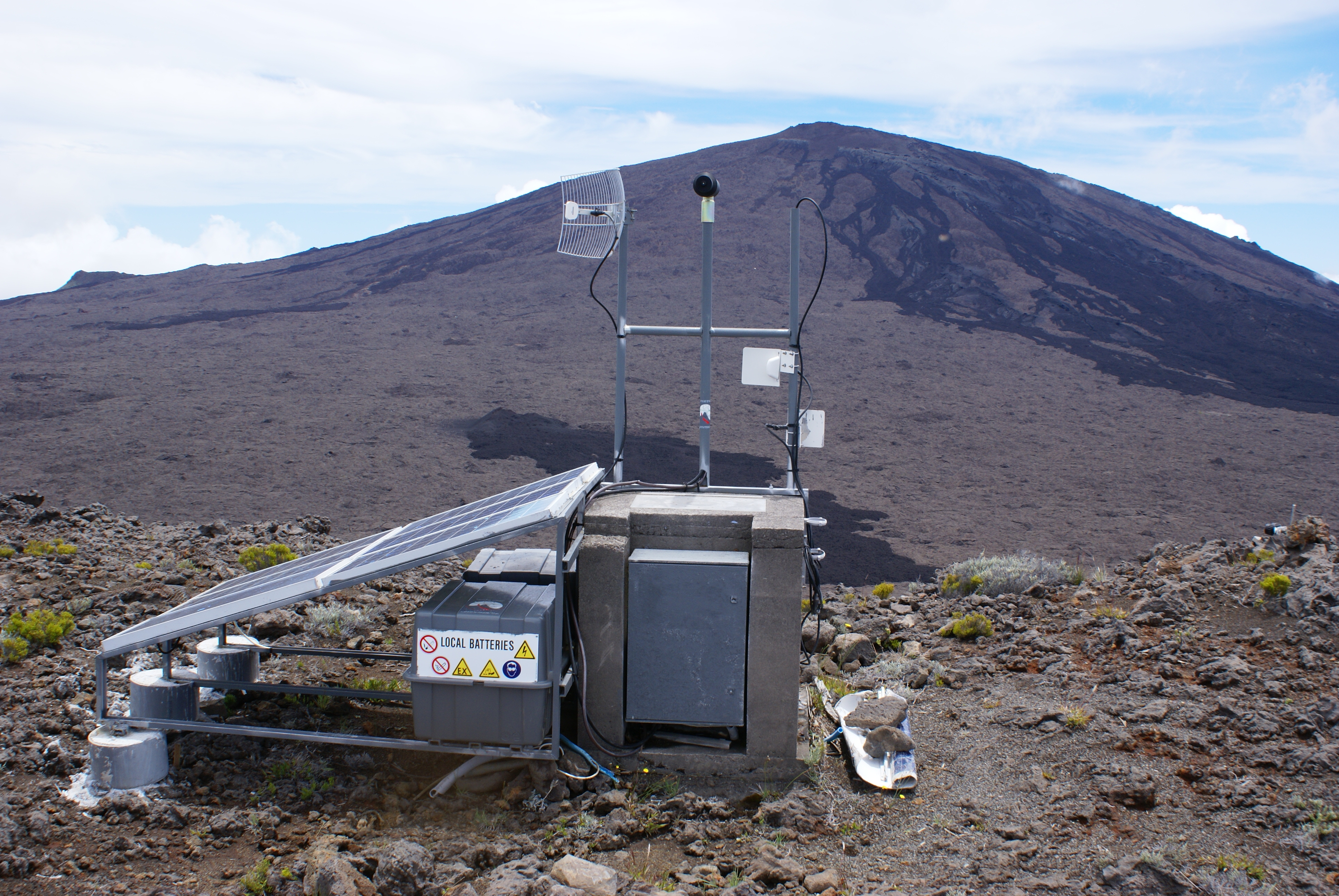
Monitoring station used by the volcano observatory to watch the deformations of Piton de la Fournaise

The Piton de la Fournaise Volcano Observatory is a volcano observatory in the village of Bourg-Murat on the island of Réunion that monitors the Piton de la Fournaise shield volcano in the Indian Ocean. It is part of the Institut de Physique du Globe de Paris, a French governmental, non-profit research and higher education establishment located in Paris.
