= International Seismological Centre =

Centre analysing earthquake seismic data

- Formation: 1964
- Director: Dmitry Storchak
- Staff: 20 (2018)
- Website: http://www.isc.ac.uk/

The International Seismological Centre (ISC) is a non-governmental, nonprofit organisation charged with the final collection, definitive analysis and publication of global seismicity. The ISC was formed in 1964 as an international organisation independent of national governments that would carry on the work of the International Seismological Summary in collecting and analyzing seismic data from around the world, and particularly to handle increased flow of data from the World-Wide Standard Seismograph Network (WWSSN), also established that year. The ISC considers its prime task to be the collection and re-analysis of all available earthquake seismic date in order to produce definitive data on earthquakes. The ISC's catalog is considered "the most complete and authoritative final depository of global earthquake parameter data."

== Purpose ==
The main scientific goal of the centre is the definitive compilation of earthquake information and the readings on which they are based. Collection of reports of earthquake effects is also an important part of its operation and the Centre recomputes the location and occurrence time of earthquakes worldwide, making use of all available information.

Since 1957 the manipulation of the large volume of data has been mainly carried out by computer. Up until then ISS locations were determined manually with the help of a large globe. The ISC now uses a network of workstations accessing a relational database of nearly 50 Gbytes of online data.

The analysis of the earthquake data is undertaken in monthly batches and begins after at least 18 months to allow the information used to be as complete as possible. Although much of the work would be impossible without the centre's large suite of computer programs, the final editing of events large enough to be detected by several independently operated networks is always carried out by seismologists who scrutinise the output for unlikely events and chance misassociation of readings.

During analysis the computer program first groups origin estimates from different agencies and then associates the individual station readings with the most likely event. In a typical month more than 200,000 station readings are analysed leading to an average of 10,000 events per month being identified, of which some 4,000 require manual review. Misassociations and other discrepancies are rectified and the remaining unassociated readings are searched for new events and previously unreported earthquakes are added to the database. The total number of events listed each month is several times greater than those obtained by any other worldwide location service and results from ISC's goal to provide a fully comprehensive list.

== Data products ==
The data the ISC collects and processes forms the basis of several data products.

=== ISC Bulletin ===
The On-line Bulletin (a printed summary is available for a fee) is the main collection of ISC data, organised by events. After approximately two years all of the data collected for an event is reviewed and the hypocenters and magnitudes recalculated; the Reviewed Bulletin is "regarded as the definitive record of the Earth's seismicity." Most of the other data products are subsets of the Bulletin.

=== ISC-EHB Bulletin ===
The original EHB Bulletin contains events from 1960 to 2008 (prior to adoption of a newer location algorithm) whose hypocentres were recalculated by the algorithm of Engdahl, van der Hilst & Buland (1998). This has been replaced by the ISC-EHB Bulletin, which extends the catalog to 2013.

=== ISC-GEM Catalogue ===
The ISC-GEM Global Instrumental Earthquake Catalogue (1900-2013) (prepared at the request of the GEM Foundation) catalogs magnitude 5.5 or greater earthquakes suitable for modeling and assessing seismic hazard and risk. Epicentral locations and hypocentral depths were recalculated from original travel time data using a consistent velocity model. Magnitudes are expressed as moment magnitude scale (M_{w}), taken either from reliable published values of seismic moment or from recalculated values of surface wave or body wave magnitude, converted to M_{w} using empirical relationships.

=== IASPEI Ground Truth (GT) reference events ===
The IASPEI reference events database contains 9280 earthquakes and explosions whose hypocenters have been located within 10 km or less, often in conjunction with on-site studies ("ground truth"). These events have seen selected to better "see" the Earth's structure, and to provide references to which seismic networks can be more accurately calibrated.

=== Event Bibliography ===
The Event Bibliography catalogs scientific papers (mainly in English) that specifically discuss over 14,000 events. A valuable listing of papers that avoids problems inherent in most search services of variant place names or spellings, or trivial mentions.

== History ==
=== List of directors ===
==== Publisher of the "Shide Circular Reports on Earthquakes" ====
- 1900–1912 J. Milne

==== Publisher of "Reports on Large Earthquakes" ====
- 1912–1917 H.H. Turner

==== Director of the International Seismological Summary ====
- 1918–1931 H.H. Turner
- 1931–1939 H. Plaskett
- 1939–1952 Sir Harold Jeffreys
- 1952–1960 R. Stoneley
- 1960–1963 P.L. Willmore

==== Director of International Seismological Centre ====
- 1964–1970 P.L. Willmore
- 1970–1977 E.P. Arnold
- 1977–1997 A.A. Hughes
- 1998–2003 R.J. Willeman
- 2004–2007 A. Shapira
- 2008–present D.A. Storchak

== Sources ==
- Adams, Robin (25 March 2010), "Notes on the history of the International Seismological Centre".
- Adams, R. D.; Richardson, W. P. (1996), "A view of South and Central America from the International Seismologocial Centre", Geofísica Internacional, 35 (3): 193–203.
- Engdahl, E.R.; van der Hilst, R.; Buland, R. (June 1998), "Global teleseismic earthquake relocation with improved travel times and procedures for depth determination" (PDF), Bulletin of the Seismological Society of America, 88 (3): 722–743, archived from the original (PDF) on 28 February 2018.
- Di Giacomo, D.; Storchak, D. A.; Safronova, N.; Ozgo, P.; Harris, J.; Verney, R.; Bondár, I. (2014), "A New ISC Service: The Bibliography of Seismic Events", Seismological Research Letters, 85 (2): 354–360, doi:10.1785/0220130143.
- Johnston, Arch C.; Halchuk, Stephen (June–July 1993), "The seismicity data base for the Global Seismic Hazard Assessment Program", Annali di Geofisica, 36 (3–4): 133–151.
- McGregor, D. M.; Hughes, A. A.; Adams, R. D. (1988), "Recent activities at the International Seismological Centre", History of Seismograms & Earthquakes of the World (PDF), Academic Press, pp. 107–111, ISBN 978-0124408708, archived from the original on 8 February 2017.
- Musson, R. M. W. (2013), "A history of British seismology", Bulletin of Earthquake Engineering, 11: 715–861, doi:10.1007/s10518-013-9444-5.
- Storchak, D. A.; Di Giacomo, D.; Bondár, I.; Engdahl, E. R.; Harris, J.; Lee, W. H. K.; Villaseñor, A.; Bormann, P. (2013), "Public Release of the ISC-GEM Global Instrumental Earthquake Catalogue (1900–2009)", Seismological Research Letters, 84 (5): 810–815, doi:10.1785/0220130034.
- Yadav, R. B. S.; Bormann, P.; Rastogi, B. K.; Das, M. C.; Chopra, S. (July–August 2009), "A Homogeneous and Complete Earthquake Catalog for Northeast India and the Adjoining Region" (PDF), Seismological Research Letters, 80 (4): 609–627, doi:10.1785/gssrl.80.4.609.
