= Patrick Willmore =

20th-century seismologist

Patrick Lever Willmore FRSE (1921–1994) was a 20th-century British seismologist remembered as inventor of the Willmore seismometer. In authorship he is P. L. Willmore.

He was Director of the Institute of Geological Science.

== Life ==
Patrick Willmore was a pupil at Worthing High School for Boys. In 1939, he took up a scholarship to read for a BA in Natural Sciences at St John's College, Cambridge. From 1946 to 1952 he was a Research Fellow at St John's College, Cambridge specialising in seismic activity. In 1952 he was appointed government Seismologist at the Dominion Observatory in Ottawa in Canada.

In 1952 he was commissioned to investigate volcanic activity on the island of St Vincent in the Caribbean and concluded that the source of volcanic activity could not be located during or after the event and concluded that sensitive areas required continual monitoring by a seismometer.

He returned to Cambridge University in 1961/62 then became Senior Seismologist at the Royal Observatory, Edinburgh. He was Director of the International Seismological Summary (ISS) from 1960 to 1963. In 1964, he became the first director of the International Seismological Centre, in Edinburgh, a role he held until 1970.

Although elected a Fellow of the Royal Society of Edinburgh he resigned in 1980.

Dr Geoffrey Robson studied under him.

== Publications ==
- Manual of Seismological Observatory Practice (1960)
- Seismology
