= Piton de la Fournaise =

Shield volcano in southeast Réunion, Indian Ocean

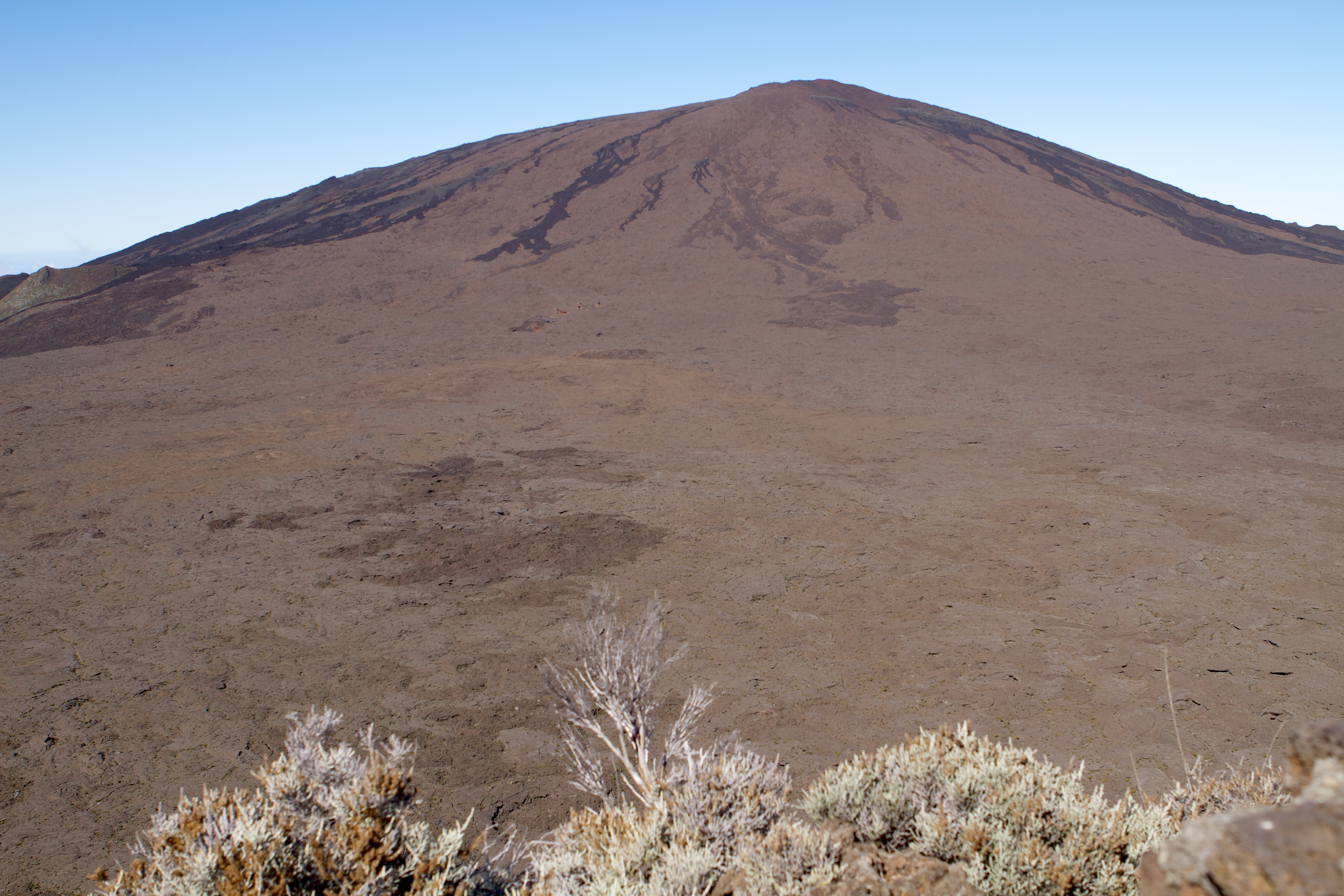
- Piton de la Fournaise is a shield volcano

Highest point
- Elevation: 2,621 m (8,599 ft)
- Prominence: 1,027 m (3,369 ft)
- Listing: Ribu
- Coordinates: 21°14′33″S 55°42′32″E

Naming
- English translation: Peak of the Furnace
- Language of name: French

Geography
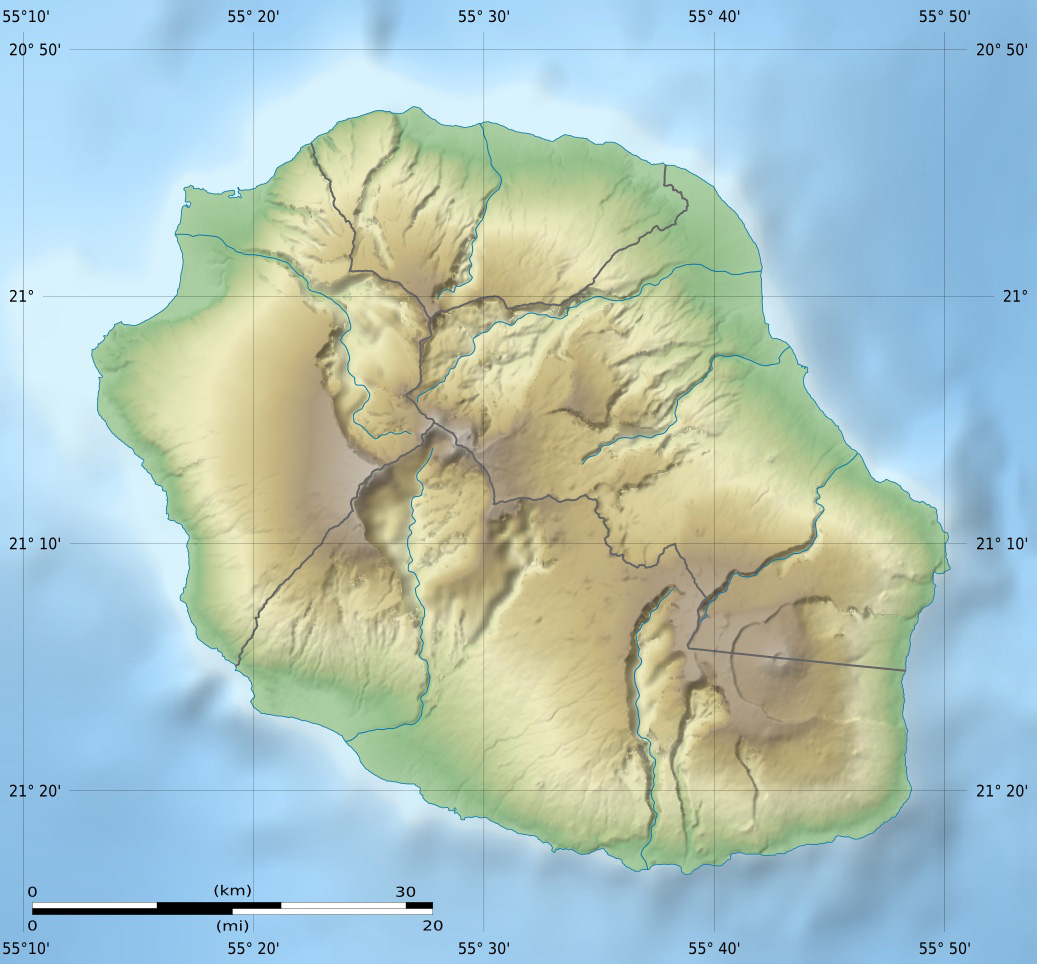
- Location within Réunion
- Location: Réunion, Indian Ocean

Geology
- Rock age: 530,000 year
- Mountain type: Shield volcano
- Last eruption: January 2026

Climbing
- First ascent: 21 September 1751

Orthoimagery

Piton de la Fournaise (French: [pitɔ̃ də la fuʁnɛz]; 'Peak of the Furnace') is a shield volcano on the eastern side of Réunion island, a French overseas department and region, in the Indian Ocean. It is currently one of the most active volcanoes in the world, along with Kīlauea in the Hawaiian Islands, Stromboli and Etna in Italy and Mount Erebus in Antarctica. The volcano is located within Réunion National Park, a World Heritage Site.

Residents of Réunion sometimes refer to Piton de la Fournaise simply as le Volcan ("the Volcano"). It is a major tourist attraction.

== Geology ==
The uppermost section of the volcano is occupied by the Enclos Fouqué, a caldera 8 kilometres (5.0 mi) wide. High cliffs, known as remparts in French, form the caldera's rim. The caldera is breached to the southeast towards the sea. The eastern flank of the volcano is unstable and is in the initial stages of failure. It will eventually collapse into the Indian Ocean, possibly causing a megatsunami in the event of a cataclysmic debris flow. There is evidence of earlier failures on the submerged flanks and surrounding abyssal plain. The lower slopes are known as the Grand Brûlé ("Great Burn"). Most volcanic eruptions are confined to the caldera.

Inside the caldera is a 400-metre-high (1,300 ft) lava shield named Dolomieu. At the top of this lava shield are Bory Crater (Cratère Bory) and Dolomieu Crater (Cratère Dolomieu), which is by far the wider of the two and named for French geologist Déodat Gratet de Dolomieu.

Topographic map showing the volcano and surrounding terrain

Many craters and spatter cones can be found inside the caldera and on the higher flanks of the volcano. Lavas with high concentrations of iridium are routinely ejected through these vents. By the trailhead of the summit path there lies a small noteworthy crater called Formica Leo, named for its resemblance to the sand pit trap of an antlion.

Located outside of the main caldera is Commerson Crater, an inactive caldera notable for receiving intense rainfall, particularly during tropical storms. During Cyclone Hyacinthe in January 1980, it received 6,433 millimetres (253.3 in) of rainfall in 15 days, the most precipitation produced by a tropical cyclone in a single location.

Some beaches in the proximity of the volcano are greenish in color, due to olivine sand derived from picrite basalt lavas. The Grand Brûlé is formed from solidified lava flows accumulated over hundreds of thousands of years; the most recent ones are often the darkest and most vegetation-free, while older ones can be covered by dense natural vegetation.

This volcano is over 530,000 years old, and for most of its history, its flows have intermingled with those from Piton des Neiges, a larger, older and heavily eroded inactive volcano which forms the northwest two-thirds of Réunion Island. There were three episodes of caldera collapses 250,000, 65,000 and 5,000 years ago. The volcano was formed by the Réunion hotspot, which is believed to have been active for the past 66 million years. There is evidence for explosive eruptions in the past. One explosive eruption about 4,700 years ago may have had a VEI (Volcanic Explosivity Index) of 5, which is the same as the 18 May 1980 eruption of Mount St. Helens.

== Eruptions ==
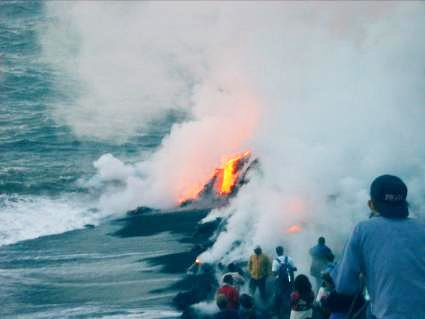
The erupting lava met the water of the Indian Ocean during the August 2004 eruption.

Video of a lava flow in August 2019

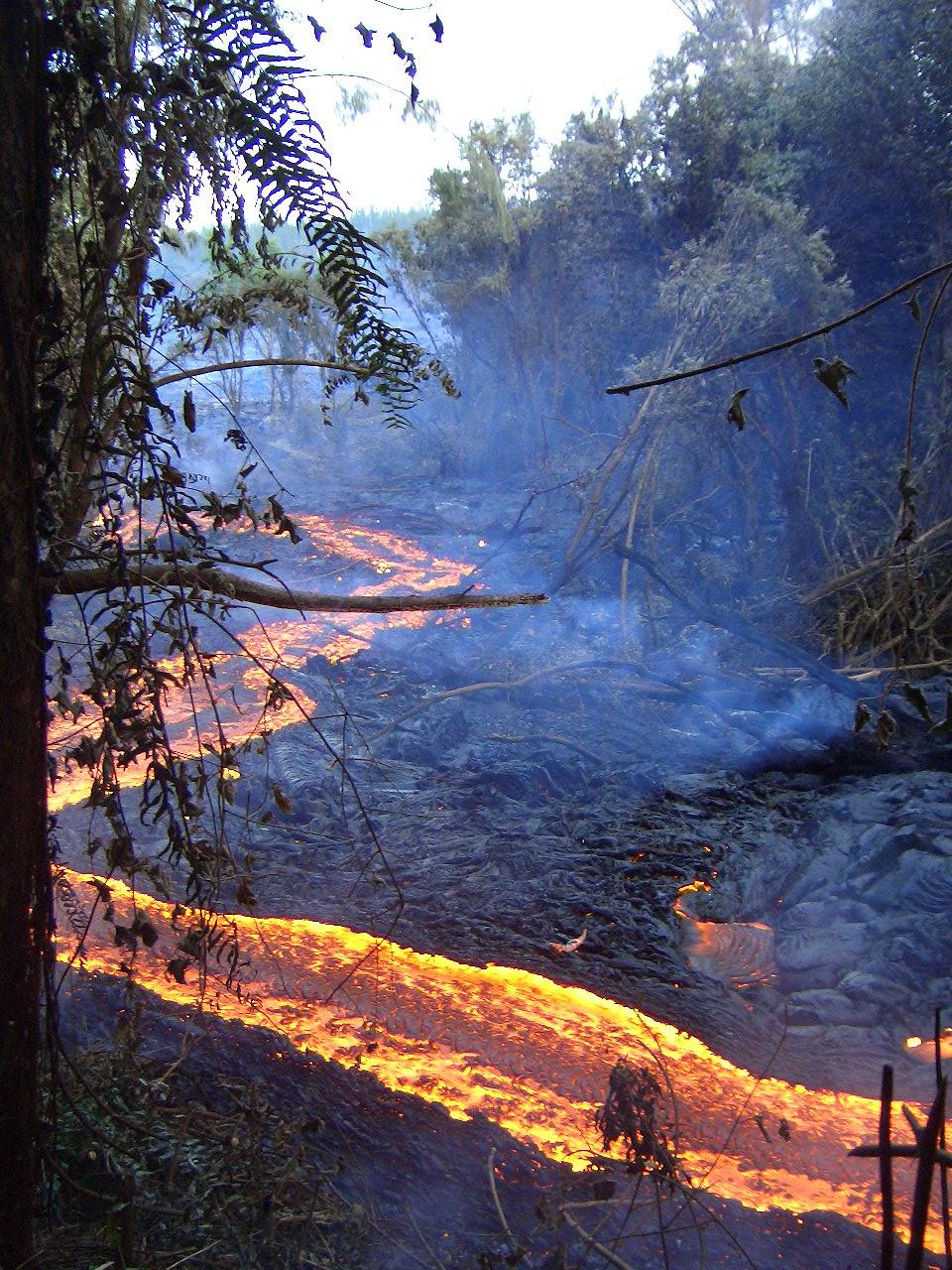
2004 eruption

Animated map of eruptions between 1972 and 2000.

Most eruptions of Piton de la Fournaise are of the Hawaiian style: fluid basaltic lava flowing out with fire fountaining at the vent. Occasionally, phreatic eruptions (groundwater steam-generated eruptions) occur. Lava flows crossing the Grand Brûlé occasionally reach the sea. Piton de la Fournaise is one of the most active volcanoes in the world, with more than 150 recorded eruptions since the 17th century.

Eruptions within the caldera pose little threat to the island population. The caldera is uninhabited, and little infrastructure exists there apart from the highway. While lava flows are generally confined to the caldera, some have been known to cross the N2 highway. Areas where the road was destroyed by an eruption were signposted after the road was rebuilt noting the year of eruption. In the early 2000s, the highway was destroyed one or more times a year. Each time, engineering services restored the road after the lava cooled off. Sections of the lava flow remained hot for months after an eruption, as evidenced by steam emanating from those areas in rainy weather.

Eruptions outside of the caldera can pose serious hazards to the population, but are rare. Only six eruptions outside of the caldera have been recorded, most recently in 1986. The village of Piton-Sainte-Rose was evacuated in 1977 before it was inundated by a lava flow which destroyed several buildings. The lava flow crossed the highway and surrounded the local church, entered the front door, then stopped without destroying the building. The front entrance was later cleared out, and the church was brought back into service under the name of Notre-Dame des Laves ("Our Lady of the Lavas").

The April 2007 eruption produced an estimated 3,000,000 cubic metres (110 million cubic feet) of lava per day. During that eruption, an incremental caldera collapse of Dolomieu occurred over a period of nine days. The collapse displaced 0.8 km × 1.1 km (0.50 mi × 0.68 mi) of floor downward by 330 m (1,080 ft), with a volume of 120 million cubic metres (4.2 billion cubic feet). The caldera collapse accompanied one of the largest eruptions of lava at the volcano in the past 100 years.

An eruption began on 2 July 2023 at 8:30 a.m. local time. Another eruption began on 18 January 2026.

== Tsunami hazard ==
The volcano poses a threat as a potential source of tsunamis in the Indian Ocean. Should the flank of the Piton de la Fournaise volcano collapse, a megatsunami event could be triggered. According to a 2013 scientific publication, an "example of worst-case scenario, a 10 km^{3} landslide on the eastern flank of Piton de la Fournaise volcano would generate waves up to 80 m high at the southern coast of Mauritius Island, which is located 170 km ENE of Réunion Island". It is believed that the volcano has experienced numerous flank collapses over the past 2 million years. The last major flank collapse is believed to have occurred 4,500 years ago.

== Monitoring ==
Volcanic activity is constantly monitored by geophysical sensors (tiltmeters, extensometers, differential GPS receivers, etc.). The data from those various sensors is sent to the Piton de la Fournaise Volcano Observatory, located in Bourg-Murat, northwest of the volcano. The observatory, founded in 1978 following the Piton-Sainte-Rose flow, is operated by the Institut de Physique du Globe de Paris (Global Geophysics Institute of Paris), in association with CNRS and the University of Réunion. The OVPF often publishes reports on Piton de la Fournaise's current activity via their website in French. RIGIC (the Réunion Island Geological Information Center) takes this information and translates it into English for distribution to the English-speaking scientific community.

Procedures specify several levels of alert, which are decided by the prefect of Réunion on the basis of scientific reports:

- Pre-alert: Warnings about possible eruptions; hikers accessing the caldera are warned about possible developments.
- Level 1: An eruption will occur soon; the public may not access the caldera until specialists have examined the situation and set pathways for those willing to admire the eruption.
- Level 2: An eruption is occurring inside the caldera. Access to the caldera is restricted to authorized personnel only.
- Level 3: An eruption is occurring or will occur soon outside of the caldera; some villages may have to be evacuated for safety.

== Access ==
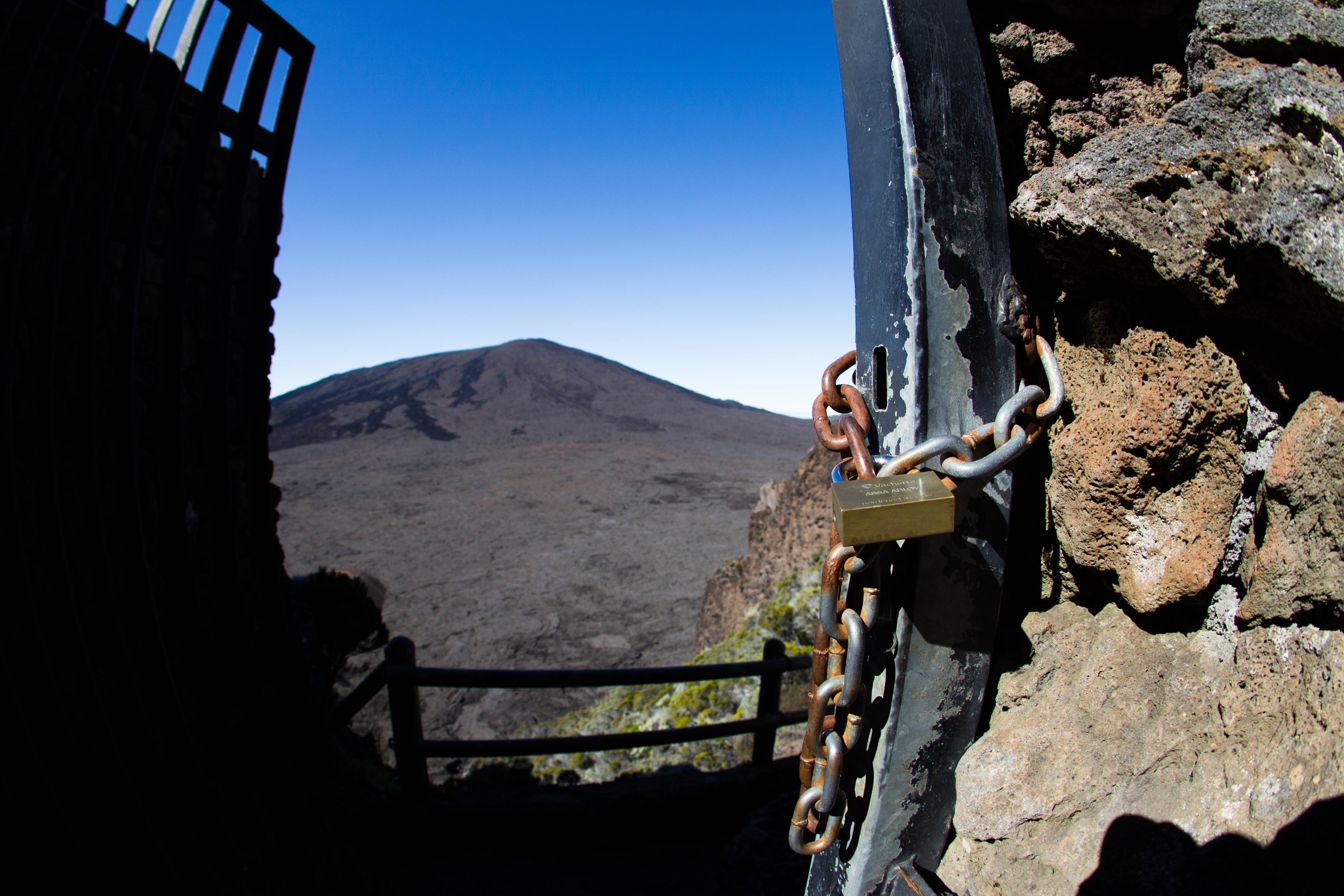
The gate for the visitors who want to climb the volcano

A forestry road followed by a track connects the highway of the plains in Bourg-Murat to the Pas de Bellecombe (Bellecombe Pass), where a parking lot and a snack bar are located. The Pas de Bellecombe is situated over the caldera rim cliffs and offers a view over the northeast part of the caldera. A stairway path descends from the pass to the caldera floor. This path is closed for safety reasons during seismic events that may precede eruptions and during eruptions. White paint marks over rocks delimit a number of footpaths ascending the lava shield inside the caldera.

The lower parts of the Grand Brûlé can be visited from the N2 highway. Lava flows that have crossed the road are indicated by signs. Completely free access during eruptions was permitted until 1998; access has been limited since that date, being virtually banned at present.

A panoramic view on the top of the volcano

== See also ==
- List of volcanoes in Réunion
- Mamelon (volcanology)
