= 2021 eruption of La Soufrière =

Volcanic eruption in the Caribbean

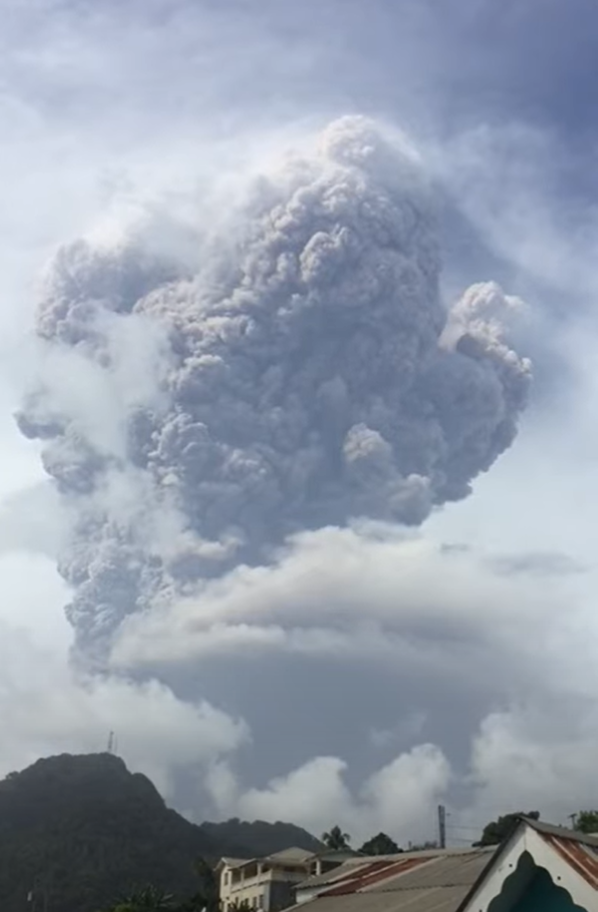
- Second explosion on 9 April 2021
- Volcano: La Soufrière
- Start date: 27 December 2020
- End date: 22 April 2021
- Type: Effusive-to-explosive
- Location: Saint Vincent, Saint Vincent and the Grenadines; 13°20′N 61°11′W
- VEI: 4
- Impact: ~16,000 people evacuated

La Soufrière, a stratovolcano on the Caribbean island of Saint Vincent in Saint Vincent and the Grenadines, began an effusive eruption on 27 December 2020. On 9 April 2021 there was an explosive eruption, and the volcano "continued to erupt explosively" over the following days, with pyroclastic flows. The activity pattern of the eruption was comparable to that of the event that occurred in 1902, which had a Volcanic Explosivity Index (VEI) of 4. The volcano is known to have erupted 23 times in the last 4,000 years, and had been dormant since 1979.

Evacuation of the inhabitants of the island began when the explosive eruptions started. Many countries, including islands in the region, and organisations provided relief and support. Services such as electricity and water were severely affected. Emitted ash and sulfur dioxide gas affected the population. The COVID-19 pandemic made evacuation more difficult, requiring usual COVID-19 precautions to avoid outbreaks.

== Effusive phase ==
As volcanoes like La Soufrière can very suddenly switch between effusive and explosive eruption phases, volcanologists were on high alert once an effusive eruption formed a new lava dome inside the summit crater on 27 December 2020. The lava dome was created on the west-southwest edge of an earlier dome that had formed during the 1979 eruption. Government officials began to reach out to residents in the area throughout December and January in order to review evacuation plans in case volcanic activity escalated.

The effusive eruption continued into January, during which time the lava dome had grown. On 6–12 January, the dome grew and expanded to the west, produced small rockfalls and emitted gas and steam plumes. The lava dome had grown taller on 14 January and had expanded to the east and west. Vegetation on the east, south and west inner crater walls was extensively damaged on 15 January, with the dome estimated to have been 90 m (300 ft) high, 160 m (520 ft) wide and 340 m (1,120 ft) long. On January 16, the expanding western dome front reached temperatures of around 590 °C (1,094 °F). A small circular depression at the top of the lava dome was releasing gas emissions. On 20–26 January, the lava dome continued to grow, releasing gas and steam plumes. The dome attained a volume of 4,450,000 m^{3} (157,000,000 ft^{3}) on 27 January, when it was estimated to be 428 m (1,404 ft) long, 217 m (712 ft) wide and 80 m (260 ft) tall.

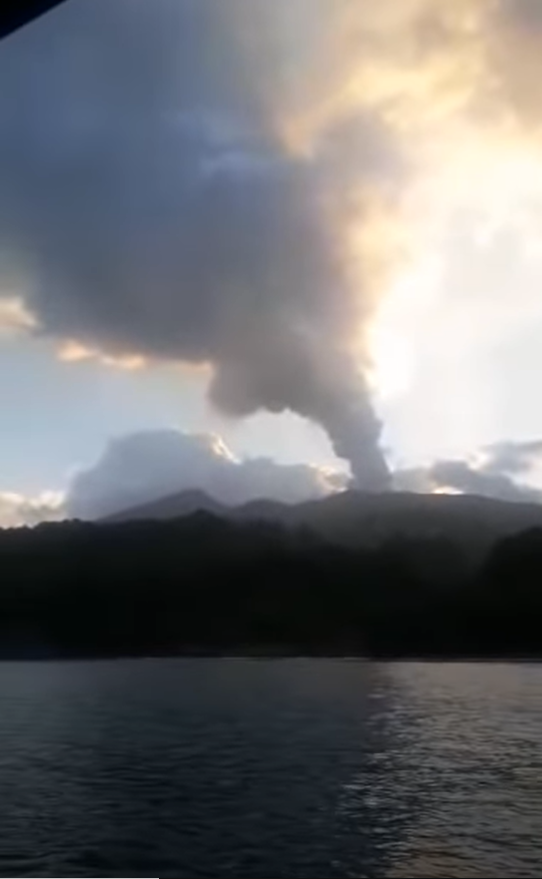
Before the first explosion

In February 2021, the lava dome was still actively growing, releasing gas and steam plumes from its top. Sulfur dioxide emissions were first detected on 1 February, which suggested that groundwater was drying up and no longer interacting with the gas species. A report of anomalously higher temperatures and gas odors prompted scientists to visit the Wallibou Hot Spring area on 7 February where they had detected hydrogen sulfide and a 5-6 degree increase in temperatures. The National Emergency Management Organisation (NEMO) reminded the public to avoid the volcano and that descending into the crater remained extremely dangerous. By 12 February, the lava dome was 618 m (2,028 ft) long, 232 m (761 ft) wide and 90 m (300 ft) tall, attaining a volume of 6,830,000 m^{3} (241,000,000 ft^{3}).

The lava dome continued to slowly grow and release gas and steam throughout March 2021. By 22 March 2021, the lava dome was 105 m (344 ft) tall, 243 m (797 ft) wide and 921 m (3,022 ft) long. Sulfur dioxide was being released from the top of the dome. A swarm of small low-frequency seismic events lasting about 45 minutes was detected by the regional monitoring network on 23 March. The cause of this swarm was likely due to magma movement beneath the dome. A series of volcano tectonic earthquakes was subsequently felt in the neighboring communities of Fancy, Owia and New Sandy Bay Village. These volcano tectonic earthquakes lasted until 26 March when only small, low frequency events associated with the growth of the lava dome were detected.

Growth of the lava dome continued into April 2021, during which time gas and steam continued to rise from its top. A swarm of volcano tectonic earthquakes more intense than the previous one began on 5 April. The events were felt in the nearby communities of Fancy and Chateaubelair. On 8 April, after a sustained increase of volcanic and seismic activity over the preceding days, a red alert was declared and an evacuation order issued as an explosion was deemed to be imminent.

== Explosive phase ==
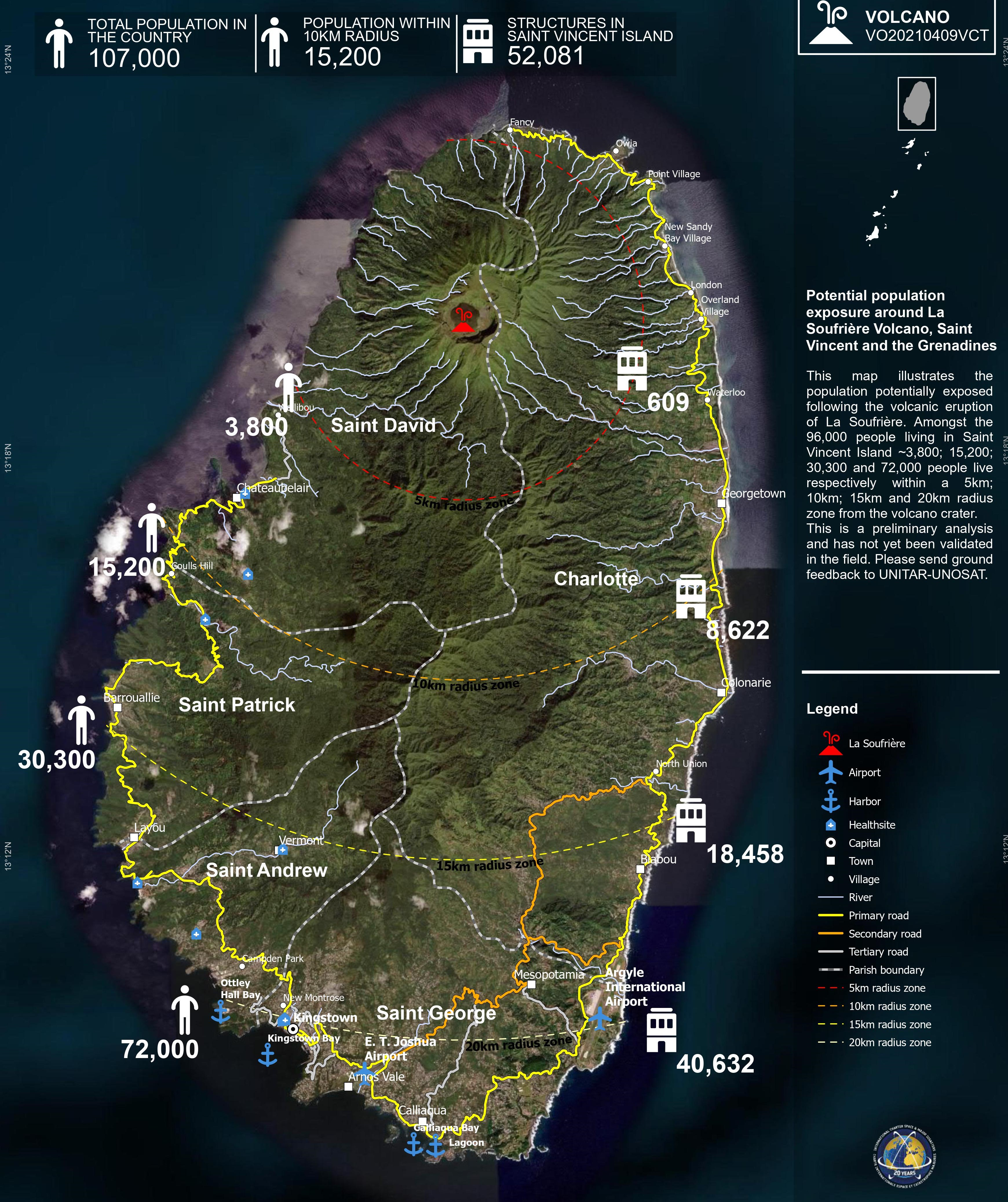
Location of the volcano on the island and risk to population

An explosive eruption occurred at 8:41 a.m. AST (12:41 UTC) on 9 April 2021, with an ash plume reaching approximately 10,000 m (32,000 ft) and drifting eastward towards the Atlantic Ocean. Approximately 16,000 people were told to evacuate the area surrounding the volcano. A warning stated that the eruption was "likely to continue for days and possibly weeks". Another explosive eruption, created by multiple pulses of ash, was reported that afternoon. The University of the West Indies Seismic Research Centre (SRC) reported a third explosive eruption starting on the evening of 9 April at 6:45 p.m. AST.

Volcanic plume of the 2nd eruption

Saint Lucia, Grenada, Antigua and Barbados all agreed to take in evacuees. Prime Minister Ralph Gonsalves encouraged people evacuating to shelters elsewhere on Saint Vincent to take the COVID-19 vaccine and said people must be vaccinated to board cruise ships or to be granted refuge on another island. Venezuelan Foreign Minister Jorge Arreaza announced via Twitter that his country would send humanitarian supplies and risk experts. Carnival Cruise Line sent Carnival Paradise and Carnival Legend; each had a capacity to transport up to 1,500 residents to neighbouring islands. The cruise line Royal Caribbean International sent Serenade of the Seas and Celebrity Reflection. Only those who had already been vaccinated against COVID-19 were accepted as evacuees by some other islands.

Satellite video of ash from the eruption

Another explosive event occurred on 11 April 2021. Prime Minister Gonsalves reported that water could no longer be supplied to most of the island, and the local airspace had been closed due to the pollution in the air. An official added: "We are covered in ash and strong sulphur scents pervade the air. [T]ake the necessary precautions to remain safe and healthy". The Barbados Defence Force was deployed to the island on a "humanitarian assistance and disaster response" mission. The International Volcanic Health Hazard Network warned that the ash is a "nuisance" to healthy people, but the ash and sulfur dioxide gas "could affect asthmatics and others with chronic health conditions".

One source reported that by 12:00 p.m. AST (16:00 UTC), "power had been restored", according to residents. Finance Minister Camillo Gonsalves expected some 16,000 people to be displaced "for about three to four months". He also expressed concern about the impact on the island's agriculture, stating that "[m]ost crops ... will be lost, and untold livestock". Finance Minister Gonsalves added that a number of houses had collapsed under the weight of the ash.

Barbados, located about 190 km (120 mi) east of Saint Vincent, had also been affected by the ash. Prime Minister Mia Amor Mottley stated that Barbados needed to prepare for weeks of falling ash. Significant amounts of ash were on the roads in Barbados by the afternoon of 11 April, and a local road safety association urged drivers to use "extreme caution" while driving because the roads were "very hazardous". Barbados's Grantley Adams International Airport remained closed. The Seismic Research Centre stated on 13 April that Barbados would continue to be affected by ash fall "for days", and in a worst-case scenario, for "weeks".

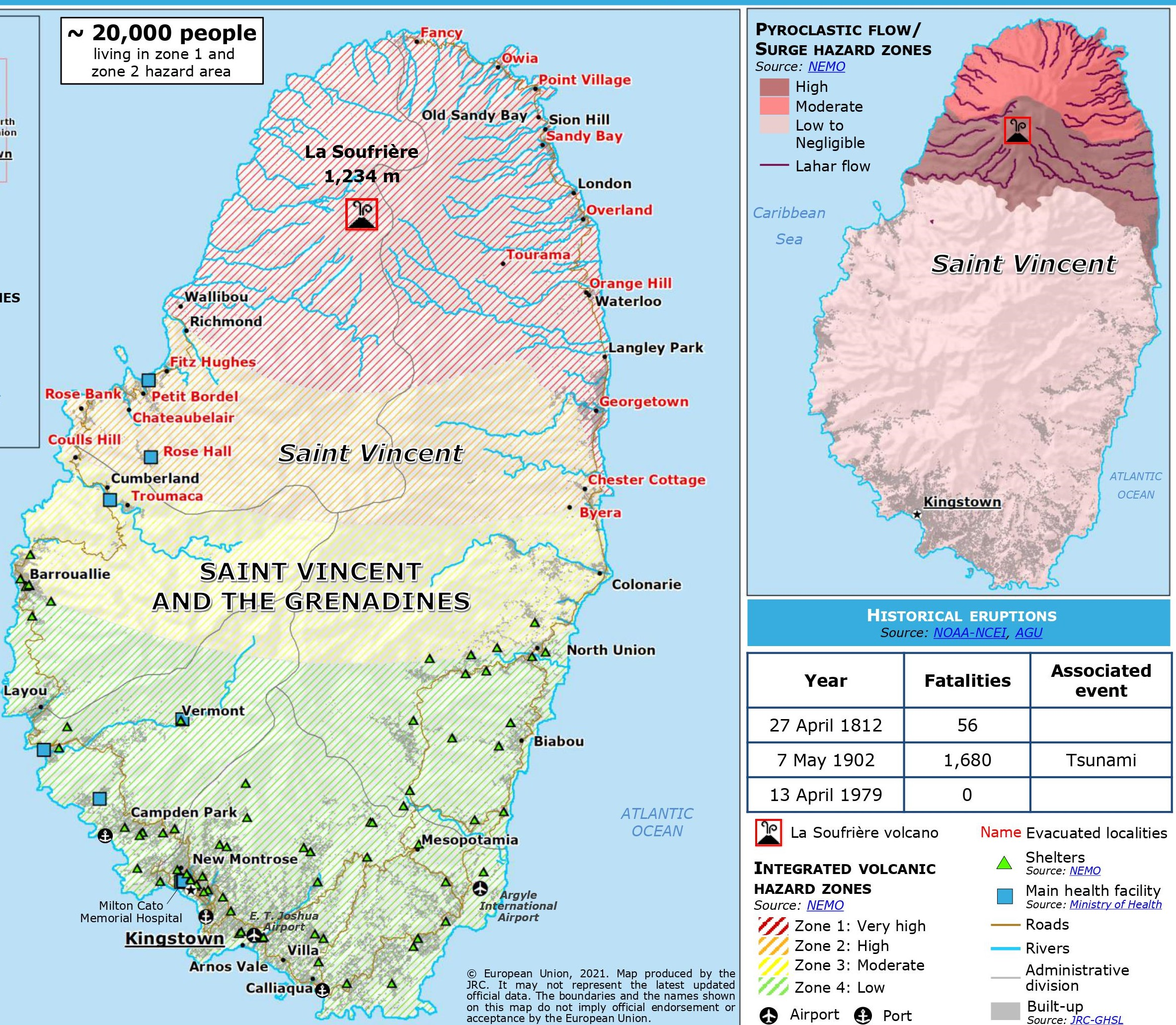
Hazard area map on left; pyroclastic flow map on right

Reports on 12 April stated that the volcano erupted again that morning and "continues to erupt explosively", generating pyroclastic flows. According to the SRC, "It's destroying everything in its path". Richard Robertson of the SRC said that both the old and new dome had been destroyed, and that "a new crater has been created". A late afternoon report on 12 April stated that the "power and water supply is intermittent in some communities". Eruptions ended on 22 April after four months of activity.

== Evacuation and relief efforts ==
The northern half of the island was most significantly affected. By 12 April, 16,000 residents had evacuated the areas of their homes; the PM pleaded with residents who had refused to leave: "it's past the hour to get out". Some 3,200 persons were living in government shelters. The United Nations stated that "about 20,000 evacuees on the Caribbean island are currently in need of shelter", and warned of a humanitarian crisis: "We are dealing with a crisis within the COVID crisis". The report added that "most livelihoods in the northern part of the island" had been seriously affected. The organization was sending water and "sanitation hygiene supplies" from Barbados. Nearby countries were also providing emergency supplies.

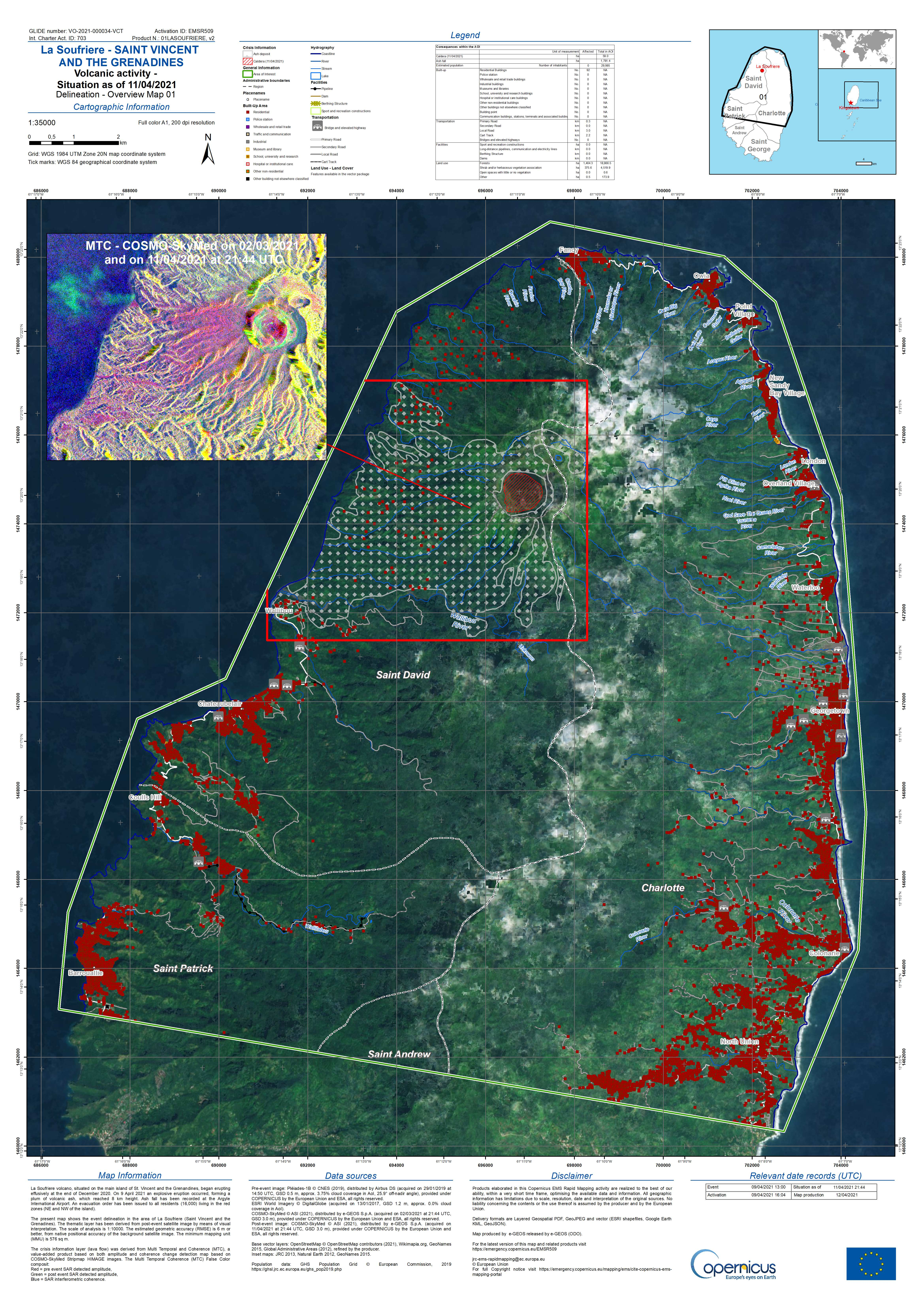
Inhabited areas near the volcano

The United Kingdom announced a £200,000 initial funding package for immediate emergency assistance and said it would send technical experts to help "restore critical lifeline facilities, like transport links ... and emergency telecommunications". The government of Trinidad and Tobago said it would send 50 members of its Defence Force, including "engineers, infantry/ provost, medical, and logistics". The Government of Grenada and other companies have also pledged to give St. Vincent and the Grenadines more than $1 million and other items such as food and water as part of its support towards helping St. Vincent and the Grenadines recover from the eruption. The PM of St. Kitts and Nevis offered an immediate US$20,000 and promised to provide EC$1 million "to assist with the evacuation and resettling" as well as assistance from its defence and police forces. The Government of Montserrat announced an aid package of EC$150,000, as well as essential supplies. Digicel planned to donate US$500,000 "worth of much-needed items" and offered to ship essentials to St Vincent for the NEMO.

The Directorate-General for European Civil Protection and Humanitarian Aid Operations in Europe was considering a plea for "financial and in-kind assistance" from St. Vincent and activated its Union Civil Protection Mechanism (UCPM). The UN agreed to provide assistance from the United Nations Environment Programme to help remove debris and ash and a spokesperson said it would be considering the request from the Prime Minister for other assistance, including financial.

The United Nations Office for the Coordination of Humanitarian Affairs estimated in mid April that the financial impact of the crisis would be approximately US$554 million. On 14 April, the UN Resident Coordinator for Barbados and the Caribbean, Didier Trebucq, announced the start of a UN funding appeal.

On 13 April, the World Bank announced that it would provide US$20 million from its Catastrophe Deferred Drawdown Option "to support the St. Vincent and the Grenadines government".

Saint Vincent and the Grenadines, La Soufrière volcano activity published April 16, 2021

By 15 April 2021, there were major concerns over COVID-19, fueled by the lack of water and positive cases being reported amongst evacuees crowded into shelters and living in cramped conditions in people's homes. About a dozen cases of COVID-19 had been reported, with multiple others reportedly having been in close contact with them.

== See also ==
- 1902 eruption of Mount Pelée
- Kick 'em Jenny
- List of volcanic eruptions by death toll
- Soufrière Hills
