= Montserrat Volcano Observatory =

Volcano observatory located on the Caribbean island of Montserrat

Coordinates: 16.748686°N 62.212784°W

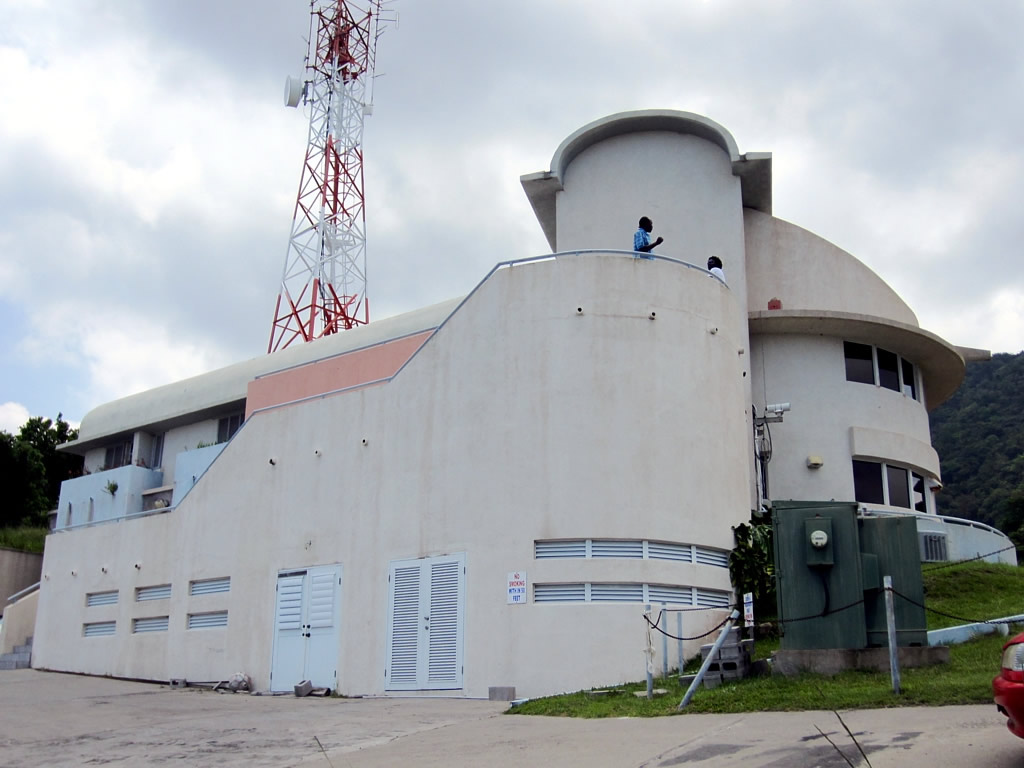
Montserrat Volcano Observatory in 2011

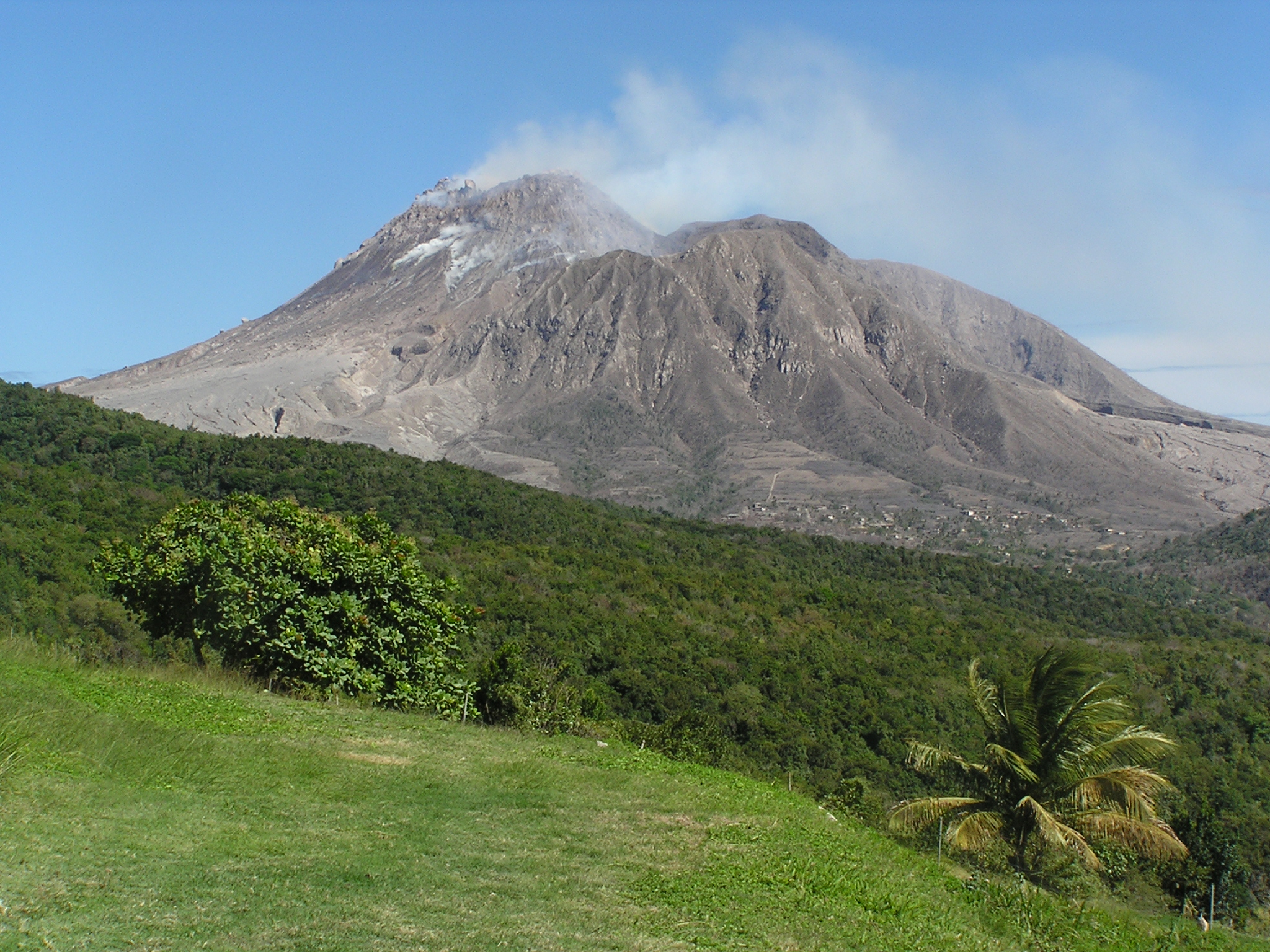
2007 view of the Soufrière Hills volcano

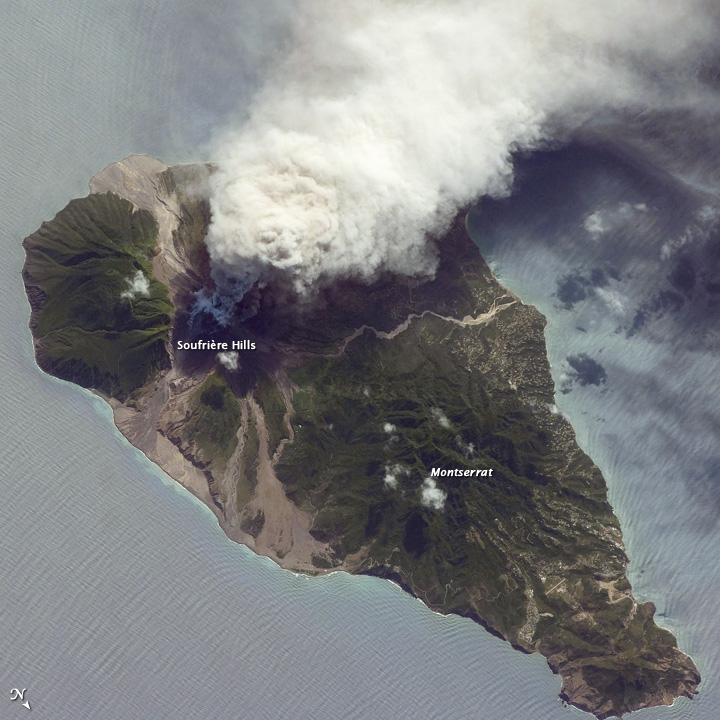
2009 satellite view of the island of Montserrat from the northeast looking southwest, showing an ash and steam plume from the Soufrière Hills volcano

The Montserrat Volcano Observatory (MVO) is a volcano observatory which is located on the Caribbean island of Montserrat, where the Soufrière Hills volcano (SHV) has been actively erupting since 1995.

The MVO staff describe their activities as working to reduce the impact of volcanic activity by monitoring, researching, educating, and advising.

The MVO building is situated in the village of Flemmings, near Salem in the parish of St. Peter, in the west of the island.

== History ==
An operational base was established by the University of the West Indies Seismic Research Unit (SRU) immediately following the first phreatic explosions on 18 July 1995. Various scientists and scientific organizations contributed in the following years, organized at various times by the SRU and British Geological Survey (BGS). The Observatory was officially established as an organization by the Montserrat Government in 1999. It is currently managed by the Seismic Research Centre, University of West Indies.

== Leadership of the Montserrat volcano observatory ==
The Observatory has been led by a Chief Scientist, or a Director, for most of the time since it was established in 1995. In the earlier stages of operation staff in these roles rotated; later the term was extended. Directors since 2000 have included

- Dr Simon Young
- Dr Peter Dunkley
- Dr Gill Norton
- Dr Sue Loughlin (2004 - 2006)
- Dr Vicky Hards (2006 - 2008)
- Dr Rod Stewart (2008, Acting)
- Dr J-C Komorowski (2008, Acting)
- Dr Nico Fournier (2009, Acting)
- Dr Richard Robertson (2009, Acting)
- Dr Paul Cole (2009 - 2013)
- Dr Rod Stewart (2013 - 2019)
- Dr Graham Ryan (2019 - )

== Reaction to the 1995 outbreaks ==
The volcanologists monitoring and researching the volcanic activities on Montserrat came under immense political pressure to provide suitable advice after the first outbreak. The eruptions have been deemed a classical example of the black swan problem as a high-profile, hard-to-predict, and rare event which provided major challenges for the prediction of further developments. Until 1995, the volcano had been silent for centuries.

After some difficulties, the involved scientists began to use statistical models to estimate the probabilities of particular events, a rather subjective method, but suitable to build up experience-based expertise (including local knowledge and experience) step by step. A 2012 study about knowledge generation and expert advice on active volcanoes used the Montserrat eruption as a showcase, but included as well interviews with scientists in the United Kingdom, Montserrat, Italy and Iceland during fieldwork seasons. It listed the Montserrat case among other recent and historical eruptions that had an influence on volcanology as a science.

== Online sites ==
Weekly reports of volcanic activity are posted on the official website; MVO also maintains Facebook and Twitter pages. The MVO has another website with profiles about MVO's staff and general work, but this website is no longer being updated.

== See also ==
- List of volcanoes in Montserrat
- National Geographic Seconds From Disaster episode, aired March 7, 2007
- List of settlements abandoned after the 1997 Soufrière Hills eruption
- MVO Tremors
