= La Soufrière (Saint Vincent) =

Active stratovolcano on the Caribbean island Saint Vincent

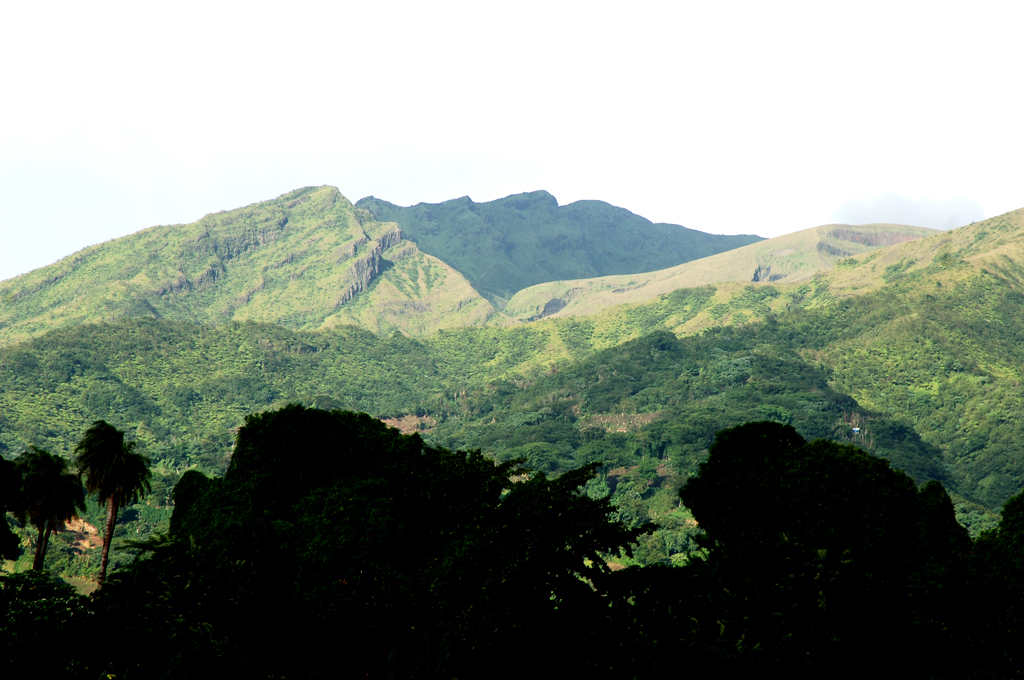

Highest point
- Elevation: 1,235 m (4,052 ft)
- Prominence: 1,234 m (4,049 ft)
- Listing: North America isolated 123rd; Country high point
- Coordinates: 13°20′N 61°11′W

Geography
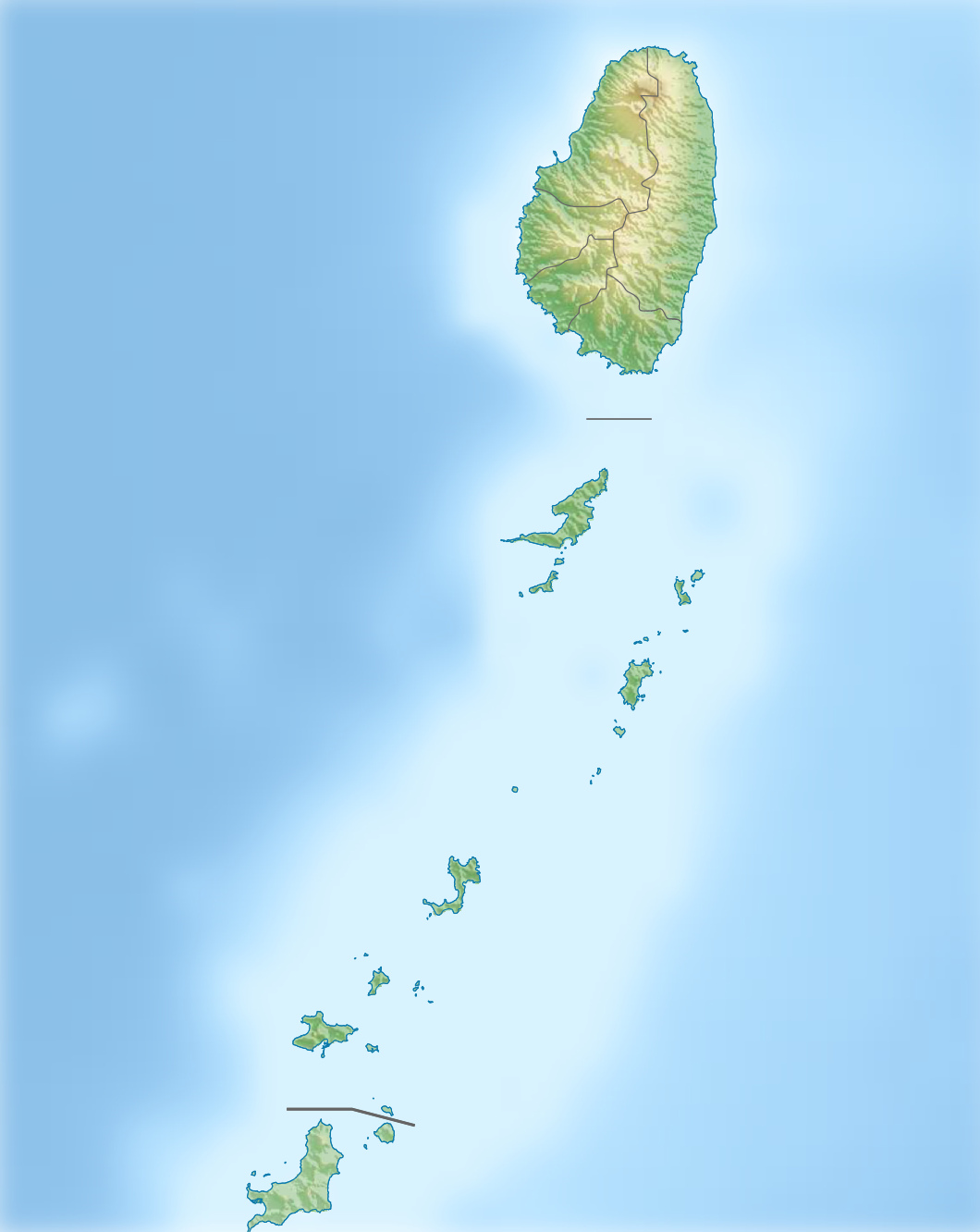
- Location within Saint Vincent and the Grenadines
- Location: Saint Vincent, Saint Vincent and the Grenadines, West Indies

Geology
- Formed by: Subduction zone volcanism
- Mountain type: Stratovolcano (active)
- Volcanic arc: Lesser Antilles Volcanic Arc
- Last eruption: 27 December 2020 – 22 April 2021

Climbing
- Easiest route: From the windward (Atlantic) side

La Soufrière or Soufrière Saint Vincent (French pronunciation: [sufʁjɛʁ sɛ̃ vɛ̃sɑ̃]) is an active volcano on the Caribbean island of Saint Vincent in Saint Vincent and the Grenadines. It is the highest peak on Saint Vincent, and has had eight recorded eruptions since 1718. The latest eruptive activity began on 27 December 2020 with the slow extrusion of a dome of lava, and culminated in a series of explosive events between 9 and 22 April 2021.

== Geography and environment ==
At 1,235 m (4,052 ft), La Soufrière is the highest peak on Saint Vincent as well as the highest point in Saint Vincent and the Grenadines. Soufrière is a stratovolcano with a crater lake and is the island's youngest and northernmost volcano. During periods of inactivity, visitors can view the volcanic crater by following a hiking trail that ascends through rainforest to the rim.

=== Important Bird Area ===
A 4,991 ha site encompassing the mountain has been designated an Important Bird Area (IBA) by BirdLife International because it supports significant populations of lesser Antillean swifts, purple and green-throated caribs, Antillean crested hummingbirds, Saint Vincent amazons, Grenada flycatchers, scaly-breasted thrashers, brown tremblers, rufous-throated solitaires, lesser Antillean euphonias, whistling warblers, Saint Vincent tanagers and lesser Antillean bullfinches.

== Eruptive history ==
La Soufrière has had five explosive eruptions during the recorded historical period. It violently erupted in 1718, 1812, 1902, 1979, and 2021. A famous painting by J. M. W. Turner of the eruption on 30 April 1812 belongs to the Victoria Gallery & Museum, University of Liverpool.

=== Eruption of 1902 ===
The Saint Vincent eruption of 6 May 1902 killed 1,680 people, just hours before the eruption of Mount Pelée on Martinique that killed 29,000. On St. Vincent, a further 600 people were injured or burned and some 4,000 were left homeless. The death zone, where almost all persons were killed, was mainly within Island Caribs habitat, an indigenous people of the Lesser Antilles in the Caribbean. This last large remnant of Carib culture was destroyed as a result of the volcano. By 1907, the volcano was considered inactive, and the crater lake had reformed.

=== Activity in 1971 ===
A minor event occurred in 1971, altering the structure of the volcano's crater lake.

=== Eruption of 1979 ===
An eruption on 13 April 1979 caused no casualties as advance warning allowed thousands of local residents to evacuate to nearby beaches. The 1979 eruption created a large ash plume that reached Barbados, 160 km (100 miles) to the east of the volcano. A newspaper report stated that two infants had died during the evacuation of some 1,500 people, though the report was not confirmed. Financial and material aid was provided by the United Kingdom and USA.

=== 2020–2021 activity ===
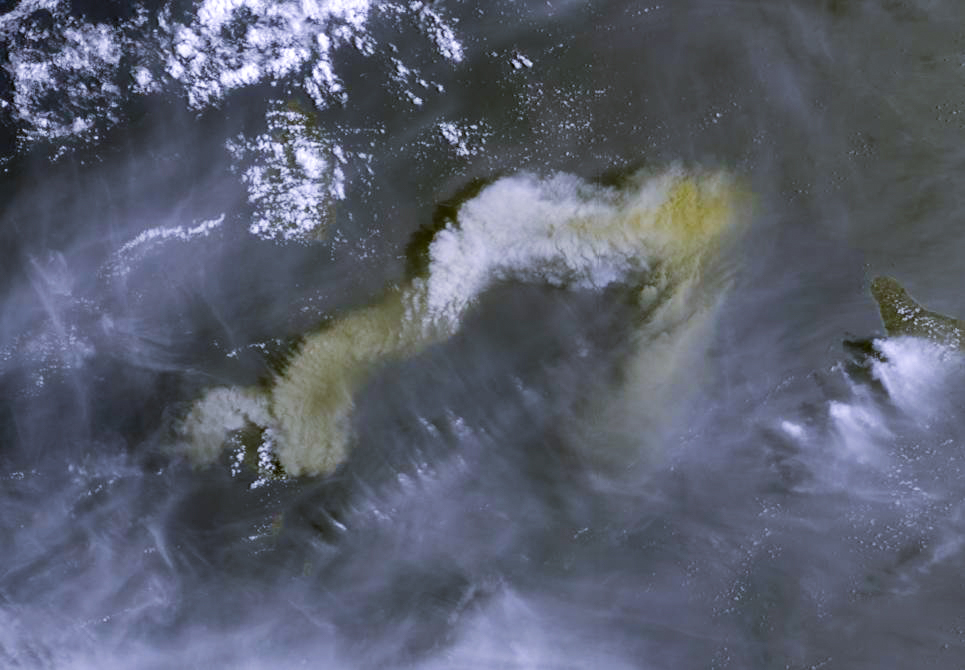
Volcanic plume seen on 9 April 2021 by the Sentinel-3B satellite

Increased seismic activity was detected in December 2020; and an effusive eruption began to form a new lava dome inside the summit crater on 27 December. Government officials began outreach efforts to residents in the area throughout December and January, in order to review evacuation plans in case volcanic activity at the volcano escalated. The effusive eruption continued into January, during which time the lava dome had grown between 100 and 200 m (330 and 660 ft) wide and 900 m (3,000 ft) long, a growth which continued in February as the lava dome was also releasing gas and steam plumes from its top. By 22 March 2021, the lava dome was 105 m (344 ft) tall, 243 m (797 ft) wide and 921 m (3,022 ft) long. Sulfur dioxide emissions were being generated from the top of the dome. On 8 April 2021, after a sustained increase of volcanic and seismic activity over the preceding days, a red alert was declared and an evacuation order issued as an explosive phase of the eruption was deemed to be imminent.

An explosive eruption occurred at 8:41 AM AST on 9 April 2021, with an ash plume reaching approximately 8,000 m (26,000 ft) and drifting eastward towards the Atlantic Ocean. By then, approximately 16,000 people had evacuated the area surrounding the volcano. Subsequent explosive eruptions, created by multiple pulses of ash, were reported in the afternoon and evening of 9 April, according to the University of the West Indies Seismic Research Centre. Explosions continued over the following days, with plumes reaching nearby Barbados and covering the island with ash. Residents were also faced with power outages and cut off water supplies, and the airspace over the island was closed due to the presence of smoke and thick plumes of volcanic ash. There were further reports of continued explosive activity and pyroclastic flows. The final explosion took place on 22 April 2021.

The eruption, rated as VEI-4 on the Explosivity Index, was comparable in size to the eruptions of 1979.

Since the 2021-2022 eruption, unrest has remained slightly elevated. Seismic activity under the volcano has continued, however, there are no signs of another eruption in the near future. On 7 October 2024, a NASA satellite picked up elevated temperatures at the summit. The Prime Minister of St. Vincent Ralph Gonsalves said "and there was no visible unusual activity in the crater being observed."

==== Support of inhabitants ====
Saint Lucia, Grenada, Antigua and Barbados all agreed to take in evacuees. Prime Minister Ralph Gonsalves encouraged people evacuating to shelters elsewhere on Saint Vincent to take the COVID-19 vaccine. Venezuelan Foreign Minister Jorge Arreaza announced via Twitter that his country would be sending humanitarian supplies and risk experts. Carnival Cruise Lines sent the Carnival Paradise and Carnival Legend to each transport up to 1,500 residents to neighbouring islands. The cruise line Royal Caribbean Group sent Serenade of the Seas and Celebrity Reflection.

Assistance and emergency financial support was being provided by several nearby islands, the United Kingdom and agencies such as the United Nations. The first significant offer of long-term funding, of US$20 million, was announced on 13 April 2021 by the World Bank.

== See also ==
- List of volcanic eruptions by death toll
