= Deaths in April 2009 =

The following is a list of deaths in April 2009.

Entries for each day are listed alphabetically by surname. A typical entry lists information in the following sequence:

- Name, age, country of citizenship at birth, subsequent country of citizenship (if applicable), reason for notability, cause of death (if known), and reference.

== April 2009 ==
=== 1 ===
- Arne Andersson, 91, Swedish middle distance runner and former world record holder (1500m).
- Umberto Betti, 87, Italian Roman Catholic prelate, Cardinal of Santi Vito, Modesto e Crescenzio since 2007.
- John Blankenchip, 89, American educator, theater director and designer, after short illness.
- Kevin Briscoe, 72, New Zealand rugby union player (Taranaki, national team).
- Paul Dean, Baron Dean of Harptree, 84, British politician, Deputy Speaker of the House of Commons (1982–1992).
- Margreta Elkins, 78, Australian mezzo-soprano, cancer.
- Duane Jarvis, 51, American guitarist and singer-songwriter, colon cancer.
- Manfred Jessen-Klingenberg, 75, German historian.
- Jan Kleyn, 83, Dutch sprinter.
- Marsel Markulin, 72, Croatian Olympic gymnast.
- Marcos Moshinsky, 88, Ukrainian-born Mexican physicist.
- Daniel Joseph O'Hern, 78, American jurist, member of the New Jersey Supreme Court (1981–2000), melanoma.
- Elaine Cancilla Orbach, 69, American actress, wife of Jerry Orbach, pneumonia.
- Lou Perryman, 67, American actor (Poltergeist, The Blues Brothers, Boys Don't Cry), stabbed.
- Miguel Ángel Suárez, 69, Puerto Rican actor, esophageal cancer.
- Ian Tomlinson, 47, British pedestrian allegedly assaulted by police at 2009 G-20 London summit protests, abdominal haemorrhage.

=== 2 ===
- Ghulam Mohammed Baloch, 50, Pakistani politician.
- Exotic Dancer, 9, French-bred British racehorse, heart attack after race.
- Ev Faunce, 82, American football player and coach.
- David Gray, 56, Scottish rugby union player (national team).
- Guttorm Hansen, 88, Norwegian politician, President of Parliament (1973–1981).
- Taj Muhammad Jamali, 70, Pakistani politician, Chief Minister of Balochistan (1990–1993).
- Albert Sanschagrin, 97, Canadian Bishop of Saint-Hyacinthe (1967–1979).
- Bud Shank, 82, American alto saxophonist, pulmonary failure.
- Frank Springer, 79, American comic book artist (Dazzler, Nick Fury, Agent of S.H.I.E.L.D., She-Hulk), prostate cancer.
- Andrew Steiner, 100, Czechoslovak-American architect and Jewish resistance member during the Holocaust.

=== 3 ===
- Ken Anderson, 33, American football player (Chicago Bears), heart attack.
- James G. Boswell II, 86, American businessman, natural causes.
- Tom Braden, 92, American journalist and author (Eight Is Enough), cardiac arrest.
- Eva Evdokimova, 60, Swiss-born American ballerina, complications of cancer.
- Charlie Kennedy, 81, American alto saxophonist, pulmonary disease.
- John King, 55, American ukulele player, heart attack.
- Victor Millan, 89, American actor (Touch of Evil, Scarface, Giant) and theatre professor.
- Alexei Parshchikov, 54, Russian poet.
- Crodowaldo Pavan, 89, Brazilian biologist and geneticist, multiple organ dysfunction syndrome and cancer.
- Tom Smith, 88, British make-up artist (Gandhi, Raiders of the Lost Ark, Return of the Jedi), heart attack.
- Jerome Waldie, 84, American politician, Representative from California (1966–1975).

=== 4 ===
- Trevor Bull, 64, British Olympic cyclist.
- Jobie Dajka, 27, Australian track cyclist, 2002 Keirin world champion.
- Adriano Directo Emperado, 82, American martial artist (kajukenbo).
- Maxine Cooper, 84, American actress (Kiss Me Deadly), natural causes
- Netherwood Hughes, 108, British fourth-to-last veteran of World War I.
- Jody McCrea, 74, American actor, cardiac arrest.
- Gonzalo Olave, 25, Chilean actor, motorcycle accident.
- Herbert Scheinberg, 89, American physician, pneumonia.
- Nelly Sindayen, 59, Filipino journalist, Manila correspondent for Time magazine, complications from diabetic stroke.
- Cecil Skotnes, 82, South African artist, pneumonia.
- Armand Tanny, 90, American bodybuilder, natural causes.
- Marvin Webster, 56, American basketball player (Seattle SuperSonics), natural causes.

=== 5 ===
- Wouter Barendrecht, 43, Dutch film producer, heart failure.
- Guy Brown, 72, Canadian politician, mayor of Springhill, Nova Scotia (2004–2008), after long illness.
- Thomas R. Byrne, 86, American politician, Mayor of Saint Paul, Minnesota (1966–1970), cancer.
- Tony D, 42, American hip hop DJ and musician, car accident.
- David Eady, 84, British film director and producer.
- Sir Michael Giddings, 88, British air marshal.
- I. J. Good, 92, British mathematician, statistician and cryptographer, natural causes.
- Sir Neil MacCormick, 67, British jurist and Scottish nationalist politician, cancer.
- Alfredo Marcano, 62, Venezuelan former WBA world super featherweight (junior lightweight) champion boxer.
- Rocco Morabito, 88, American Pulitzer Prize-winning photographer.
- Nancy Overton, 83, American pop singer (The Chordettes), esophageal cancer.
- Constantine Papadakis, 63, Greek-born American president of Drexel University, complications from lung cancer.
- William Tobin, 83, American journalist, esophageal cancer.
- George Tribe, 88, Australian cricketer.
- Ole Gabriel Ueland, 78, Norwegian politician.
- David Wheatley, 59, British film and television director, after long illness.

=== 6 ===
- A-Sun, 34, Taiwanese singer, breast cancer.
- Steve Cannon, 81, American radio personality (WCCO), cancer.
- J. M. S. Careless, 90, Canadian historian.
- Luigi Casola, 87, Italian cyclist.
- Dwight Crandell, 86, American volcanologist, heart attack.
- Dorothy Cullman, 91, American philanthropist, complications of brain injury.
- Russell E. Dunham, 89, American war veteran, Medal of Honor recipient, heart failure.
- Jacques Hustin, 69, Belgian singer-songwriter.
- Shawn Mackay, 26, Australian rugby union player (Brumbies), cardiac arrest following car accident.
- Ivy Matsepe-Casaburri, 71, South African Minister of Communications (since 1999) and acting President (2008), natural causes.
- Andrzej Stelmachowski, 84, Polish academic and politician.
- Mari Trini, 61, Spanish pop singer and actress.
- Svetlana Ulmasova, 56, Uzbekistani athlete.
- Damouré Zika, 85, Nigerien film actor and traditional healer, after long illness.

=== 7 ===
- Dave Arneson, 61, American game designer, co-creator of Dungeons & Dragons, cancer.
- Samuel Beer, 97, American academic, expert on British government.
- Raja Chelliah, 86, Indian economist, founder of Madras School of Economics, after short illness.
- Stanley Jaki, 84, Hungarian-born American theologian, heart attack.
- Philip Moore, Baron Moore of Wolvercote, 88, British private secretary to Queen Elizabeth II (1977–1986).
- Paddy O'Hanlon, 65, Irish politician and barrister, after short illness.
- Leo Prieto, 88, Filipino sports executive, PBA Commissioner (1975–1982), stroke.
- Gordon Slynn, Baron Slynn of Hadley, 79, British jurist, cancer.
- Michael Stern, 98, American journalist and philanthropist, co-founder of Intrepid Sea-Air-Space Museum, pancreatic cancer.
- Hyacinth Tungutalum, 62, Australian politician, heart attack.
- Jack Wrangler, 62, American pornographic film actor, writer, and producer, emphysema.

=== 8 ===
- Lennie Bennett, 70, British comedian and game show host (Lucky Ladders), after short illness.
- Jane Bryan, 90, American actress, after long illness.
- Willard Fuller, 93, American faith healer.
- Henri Meschonnic, 76, French poet, linguist, translator and theoretician.
- Dan Miller, 67, American television journalist (WSMV, KCBS), heart attack.
- Piotr Morawski, 32, Polish mountain climber, mountaineering accident.
- Marat Nyýazow, 75, Turkmen-born Soviet sport shooter, Olympic silver medalist (1960).
- Jean Overton Fuller, 94, British writer and painter.
- Tam Paton, 70, Scottish music manager and spokesperson for the Bay City Rollers, suspected heart attack.
- Tori Stafford, 8, Canadian murder victim, blunt trauma.
- David Winans, 74, American gospel singer, heart attack.

=== 9 ===
- Nick Adenhart, 22, American baseball pitcher (Los Angeles Angels of Anaheim), car accident.
- Edgar Buchwalder, 92, Swiss Olympic cyclist and silver medalist.
- Randy Cain, 63, American singer (The Delfonics).
- Mike Casey, 60, American college basketball player (Kentucky Wildcats) (1967–1971), heart disease.
- Colin Jordan, 85, British politician and Neo-Nazi activist.
- Ernest Manirumva, Burundian anti-corruption activist (OLUCOME), stabbed.
- Shakti Samanta, 83, Indian film director and producer, cardiac arrest.
- Dale Swann, 61, American character actor, complications of stroke.

=== 10 ===
- Richard Arnell, 91, English composer.
- John Spoor Broome, 91, American rancher and philanthropist.
- Richard Cartwright, 95, British Anglican prelate, Bishop of Plymouth (1972–1982).
- Blake Chanslor, 88, American businessman, founder of Blake's Lotaburger.
- Deborah Digges, 59, American poet, apparent suicide by jumping.
- Rocky Hill, 62, American blues guitarist, singer, and bassist.
- Frank Morris, 85, Canadian football player and executive, after long illness.
- Naum Olev, 70, Russian lyricist.
- Yevgeny Vesnik, 86, Russian actor, stroke.

=== 11 ===
- Aida Abdullayeva, 86, Azerbaijani harpist.
- Jim Brodie, 88, New Zealand geologist, oceanographer and geophysicist.
- Mickey Cafagna, 65, American politician, mayor of Poway, California, complications from kidney cancer.
- Simon Channing Williams, 63, British film producer, cancer.
- Albert Chernenko, 74, Russian philosopher, son of Konstantin Chernenko.
- Rob Dickson, 45, Australian football player, winner of Australian Survivor, car accident.
- Gerda Gilboe, 94, Danish actress.
- B. M. Idinabba, 88, Indian poet and activist, physical disorders.
- Judith Krug, 69, American librarian, founder of Banned Books Week, stomach cancer.
- René Monory, 85, French politician, President of the Senate (1992–1998).
- Tita Muñoz, 82, Filipino actress, after long illness.
- Jimmy Neighbour, 58, British footballer (Norwich City, Tottenham Hotspur), heart attack.
- Vishnu Prabhakar, 97, Indian writer, after long illness.
- Johnny Roadhouse, 88, British saxophonist.
- Al Rosenbaum, 82, American sculptor, co-founder of the Virginia Holocaust Museum.
- Corín Tellado, 81, Spanish novelist, heart failure.
- Zeke Zarchy, 93, American swing music jazz trumpeter.

=== 12 ===
- Sitara Achakzai, 52, Afghan women's rights activist and politician, shot.
- Javier de Bengoechea, 89, Spanish poet.
- Danny Cameron, 85, Canadian politician, Leader of the Opposition in the Legislative Assembly of New Brunswick (1991–1995).
- Marilyn Chambers, 56, American pornographic film actress (Behind the Green Door), erotic dancer, and politician, heart disease.
- Kent Douglas, 73, Canadian ice hockey player (Toronto Maple Leafs), cancer
- Robin Guthrie, 71, British teacher.
- Gene Handley, 94, American baseball player.
- Mike Keen, 69, British footballer, after short illness.
- Hans Kleppen, 102, Norwegian ski jumper.
- Sir Kirby Laing, 92, British civil engineer.
- Louis Leysen, 77, Belgian footballer.
- Sir John Maddox, 83, British science writer, editor (Nature, 1966–1973, 1980–1995).
- Stephen Minarik, 49, American politician, chairman of the New York Republican State Committee (2004–2006), heart attack.
- Ephraim Obot, 72, Nigerian Roman Catholic prelate, Bishop of Idah since 1977.
- Franklin Rosemont, 65, American surrealist poet, labor historian and co-founder of the Chicago Surrealist Group.
- Eve Kosofsky Sedgwick, 58, American writer and critical theorist, pioneer of queer studies, breast cancer.
- Ishaq Shahryar, 73, Afghan-born American scientist and ambassador.
- Derek Weiler, 40, Canadian editor and writer.

=== 13 ===
- John Armitage, 88, Australian politician, MP (1961–1963, 1969–1983).
- Björn Borg, 89, Swedish Olympic swimmer.
- Stefan Brecht, 84, German poet, son of Bertolt Brecht and Helene Weigel, after long illness.
- Frank Costigan, 78, Australian lawyer and royal commissioner, head of the Costigan Commission.
- Tony Eckstein, 85, American politician and veterinarian.
- Mark Fidrych, 54, American baseball pitcher (Detroit Tigers), suffocation.
- Jack D. Hunter, 87, American author, cancer.
- Harry Kalas, 73, American sportscaster, heart attack.
- Ossie Lambert, 82, Australian cricketer.
- Ángel Miguel, 79, Spanish professional golfer.
- Bruce Snyder, 69, American football coach, melanoma.
- Alfred Swift, 77, South African Olympic cyclist.
- Teo Usuelli, 78, Italian film score composer.
- Kevin Walton, 90, British winner of the Albert Medal.
- Zhu Min, 83, Chinese professor and daughter of Zhu De.

=== 14 ===
- Richard Baker, 62, American surf apparel executive (Ocean Pacific), cancer.
- Maurice Druon, 90, French novelist, Dean of the Académie française (French Academy), and French Resistance fighter.
- Fuyuko Kamisaka, 78, Japanese historian, author and critic, cancer.
- Les Keiter, 89, American sportscaster, natural causes.
- Max Lake, 84, Australian winemaker, fall.
- Marcus Loane, 97, Australian Anglican Primate (1978–1982), Archbishop of Sydney (1966–1982), after short illness.
- Jack McCoy (racing driver, born 1937), 72, American racing driver.
- Peter Rogers, 95, British film producer (Carry On series).
- Royce Ryton, 84, British playwright.

=== 15 ===
- Ed Blake, 83, American baseball player, after long illness.
- Sir Clement Freud, 84, German-born British writer, broadcaster and politician, MP (1973–1987).
- Merle Harmon, 82, American sportscaster, pneumonia.
- Wisdom Siziba, 28, Zimbabwean cricketer, heart failure.
- László Tisza, 101, Hungarian-born American physicist.

=== 16 ===
- Patty Costello, 61, American ten-pin bowler, pancreatic cancer.
- Michael Martin Dwyer, 24, Irish security guard, shot.
- Sal Guarriello, 90, American politician, after short illness.
- Tengiz Gudava, 55, Georgian-born Soviet dissident and journalist (RFE/RL).
- Timothy J. Holst, 61, American circus ringmaster, after short illness.
- James D. Houston, 75, American author, cancer.
- Jim Lange, 82, American editorial cartoonist (The Oklahoman), after long illness.
- Svein Longva, 65, Norwegian economist, State Conciliator (2005–2009).
- Michel Mondésert, 92, French Roman Catholic prelate, Auxiliary Bishop of Grenoble.
- Abdel Halim Muhammad, 99, Sudanese doctor, President of the CAF (1968–1972), member of Committee of Sovereignty of The Sudan (1964–1965).
- Viktor Paskov, 59, Bulgarian writer, lung cancer.
- Eduardo Rózsa-Flores, 49, Hungarian journalist, writer, actor and soldier, shot.
- Saensak Muangsurin, 58, Thai former WBC light welterweight champion boxer (fastest ever pro champion), intestinal complications.

=== 17 ===
- Sir Martin Garrod, 73, British army general, Commandant General Royal Marines (1987–1990).
- Väinö Hakkarainen, 76, Finnish Olympic wrestler.
- Momtaj Iqbal, Bangladeshi politician.
- Mike Leadbetter, 62, English rugby union player (national team) and rugby league player (Rochdale Hornets).
- Carmen Leggio, 82, American jazz tenor saxophonist.
- Midge Miller, 86, American politician, member of the Wisconsin State Assembly (1971–1985), cancer.
- Honoré Desmond Sharrer, 88, American artist.

=== 18 ===
- Tissa Abeysekara, 69, Sri Lankan film director, writer and actor, brain haemorrhage.
- Yvon Bourges, 87, French politician and colonial administrator, Governor-General of French Equatorial Africa.
- Toi Aukuso Cain, 50, Samoan politician and murderer, liver cancer.
- Peter Dennis, 75, British actor (Sideways, Hadleigh, Shrek).
- Edward George, Baron George, 70, British public official, Governor of the Bank of England (1993–2003), lung cancer.
- Vernon Malone, 77, American politician, member of the North Carolina Senate (2003–2009), natural causes.
- Bill Orton, 60, American politician, member of the US House of Representatives from Utah (1991–1997), ATV accident.
- Stephanie Parker, 22, British actress (Belonging), apparent suicide by hanging.
- Charles Peebler, 72, American advertising executive, progressive supranuclear palsy.
- Whitelaw Reid, 95, American journalist, complications of lung and heart failure.
- Kiril Vajarov, 21, Bulgarian ice hockey goaltender, member of the national team (2006–2009), stabbed.
- Elías Wessin y Wessin, 84, Dominican politician and general, cardiac arrest.

=== 19 ===
- J. G. Ballard, 78, British novelist, prostate cancer.
- Doc Blanchard, 84, American college football player (Army), Heisman Trophy winner (1945), pneumonia.
- Tilahun Gessesse, 68, Ethiopian singer.
- Robert Gillis, 82, American football coach.
- Tony Kett, 57, Irish politician, cancer.
- Božo Kos, 77, Slovenian illustrator and caricaturist.
- Kaimar-ud-Din bin Maidin, 66, Malaysian Olympic athlete.
- Tharon Musser, 84, American lighting designer, after long illness.
- Dicky Robinson, 82, British footballer (Middlesbrough), after long illness.
- Terrell Starr, 82, American politician, member of the Georgia State Senate (1968–2006), heart failure.

=== 20 ===
- Beata Asimakopoulou, 77, Greek actress, cancer.
- Thomas Hill, 81, American actor (The NeverEnding Story, Newhart, McCabe & Mrs. Miller).
- Qian Lingxi, 92, Chinese physicist and civil engineer, President of Dalian University of Technology.
- Franco Rotella, 42, Italian footballer, melanoma.

=== 21 ===
- Iqbal Bano, 74, Indian-born Pakistani singer, after short illness.
- Paul Ebert, 76, American college baseball and basketball player and surgeon, myocardial infarction.
- Robin Gillett, 83, British Lord Mayor of London (1976–1977).
- Jack Jones, 96, British trade union leader, veteran of the International Brigades.
- H. S. S. Lawrence, 85, Indian educationalist.
- Vivian Maier, 83, American street photographer.
- James Byron Moran, 78, American jurist (United States District Court for the Northern District of Illinois), after long illness.
- Santha Rama Rau, 86, Indian-born American writer, cardiac arrest.

=== 22 ===
- Ken Annakin, 94, British film director (The Longest Day, Battle of the Bulge, Those Magnificent Men in Their Flying Machines), complications from a heart attack and stroke.
- Jack Cardiff, 94, British cinematographer (A Matter Of Life And Death, Black Narcissus, The African Queen), Oscar winner (1948).
- Ron Cash, 59, American baseball player (Detroit Tigers).
- Marilyn Cooper, 74, American actress (Woman of the Year, The Thorns, Family Business), Tony winner (1981).
- Bill Disney, 77, American Olympic silver medal-winning (1960) speed skater, emphysema.
- David Kellermann, 41, American businessman, CFO of Freddie Mac since 2008, suicide by hanging.
- George Rawlings, 87, American politician, member of the Virginia House of Delegates (1964–1969).
- Heinz Schröder, 80, German puppeteer.
- Dudley Thornton, 89, British army officer.
- Kim Weiskopf, 62, American television producer and writer (Married... with Children, Full House, Three's Company), pancreatic cancer.

=== 23 ===
- William F. Barnes, 91, American football coach (UCLA), complications from pneumonia.
- Kenneth Paul Block, 84, American fashion illustrator.
- Sir Brian Corby, 79, British businessman, President of the CBI.
- Gordon Gair, 92, Canadian lacrosse player.
- Lam Sheung Yee, 74, Hong Kong footballer, coach, announcer and actor.
- Ivan Madray, 74, Guyanese cricketer, hypertension.
- Felipe Solís Olguín, 64, Mexican archaeologist, curator of the National Anthropology Museum, cardiac arrest.

=== 24 ===
- Irving D. Chais, 83, American businessman, owner of the New York Doll Hospital, after long illness.
- Tim Curry, 70, American attorney, District Attorney for Tarrant County, Texas, (1972–2009), lung cancer.
- Pringle Fisher, 70, Scottish rugby union player (national team).
- Margaret Gelling, 84, British toponymist.
- Bo Leuf, 56, Swedish technology writer.
- John Michell, 76, British author, cancer.
- Sixto Palavecino, 94, Argentine poet and musician.
- Michael Parsons, 48, Australian footballer, brain tumour.
- Orville Howard Phillips, 85, Canadian politician, member of the Senate of Canada (1963–1999), stroke.
- Franciszek Sobczak, 69, Polish Olympic fencer.
- Timothy Wright, 61, American pastor and gospel singer, car accident.

=== 25 ===
- Bea Arthur, 86, American actress (Maude, The Golden Girls, Mame), Emmy winner (1977, 1988), cancer.
- Yamil Chade, 88, Lebanese-born Puerto Rican sports team owner and manager.
- Hassan Hathout, 84, Egyptian-born American physician and interfaith campaigner.
- Germán Martínez Hidalgo, 79, Mexican scientist.
- John Marchi, 87, American politician, member of the New York State Senate (1957–2006), complications from pneumonia.
- William Schmidt, 83, American composer.
- Jock Scott, 61, American politician.
- Birgitta Wolf, 96, Swedish writer.

=== 26 ===
- James Addy, 69, Ghanaian athlete.
- Salamo Arouch, 86, Greek-born Israeli boxer and Holocaust survivor.
- Barbara Birdfeather, 69, American DJ.
- Alan Bristow, 84, British businessman.
- Hans Holzer, 89, Austrian-born American paranormal investigator and author, after long illness.
- Geir Hovig, 64, Norwegian radio host, after short illness.
- Danny Kladis, 92, American racecar driver.
- Levan Mikeladze, 52, Georgian diplomat and politician, heart attack.
- Dominic Motikoe, Lesotho politician, shot.
- Colwyn Philipps, 3rd Viscount St Davids, 70, British aristocrat and politician.
- Sir Pupuke Robati, 84, Cook Islands politician and doctor, Prime Minister (1987–1989).
- Bronislav Yermak, 39, Russian banker, plane crash.
- Perez Zagorin, 88, American historian.

=== 27 ===
- Hirmis Aboona, 69, Iraqi historian.
- Ernie Barnes, 70, American neo-mannerist artist and football player, after short illness.
- John Crispo, 75, Canadian economist and educator, prostate cancer.
- Tom Deitz, 57, American science fiction author, heart failure.
- Miroslav Filip, 80, Czech chess player.
- Frank Gansz, 70, American football coach (Kansas City Chiefs), complications from knee replacement surgery.
- Glen Gondrezick, 53, American basketball player, complications following heart transplant.
- Tomohiko Ikoma, 76, Japanese football player and manager.
- Feroz Khan, 69, Indian actor, cancer.
- Frankie Manning, 94, American dancer and choreographer, pneumonia.
- Edwin McClellan, 83, British Japanologist.
- Evgeniya Miroshnichenko, 77, Ukrainian opera and chamber singer.
- Karl Mullen, 82, Irish rugby union player.
- Greg Page, 50, American boxer, complications from brain injury.
- Paraluman, 85, Filipina actress.
- Robley Rex, 107, American World War I-era veteran.
- Woo Seung-yeon, 25, South Korean actress and model, suicide by hanging.

=== 28 ===
- Bill Bailey, 75, British surfer.
- Lota Delgado, 90, Filipina actress.
- U. A. Fanthorpe, 79, British poet.
- Fritz Gödicke, 89, German football player and manager.
- Vern Gosdin, 74, American country music singer, complications from a stroke.
- Ekaterina Maximova, 70, Russian ballet dancer.
- Steinar Lem, 57, Norwegian environmentalist and anti-consumerism activist, cancer.
- Richard Pratt, 74, Australian businessman, prostate cancer.
- Valeria Peter Predescu, 62, Romanian singer, heart attack.
- Ted Reynolds, 84, Canadian sportscaster (CBC Television).
- Buddy Rose, 56, American professional wrestler.
- Bruno Scolari, 48, Italian Olympic equestrian.
- Pearse Wyse, 81, Irish politician.

=== 29 ===
- Günther Bahr, 87, German Luftwaffe fighter pilot.
- Jack Lohrke, 85, American baseball player, stroke.
- Tom McGrath, 68, British poet and playwright, liver cancer.
- William A. Price, 94, American journalist.
- Charles L. Young Sr., 77, American politician, member of the Mississippi House of Representatives, heart attack.

=== 30 ===
- Amparo Arozamena, 92, Mexican actress, heart attack.
- Venetia Burney, 90, British teacher who named Pluto.
- Maxime de la Falaise, 86, British model, socialite, fashion designer, cookbook writer and gastronome, natural causes.
- Harold Fischer, 83, American Air Force officer, Korean War fighter ace and noted PoW, complications from surgery.
- Mallory Horne, 84, American politician, member of Florida House of Representatives, President of Florida Senate, lung cancer.
- Mark I. Levy, 59, American lawyer, apparent suicide.
- Maurice Lindsay, 90, British poet and broadcaster.
- McCoy McLemore, 67, American basketball player and television color analyst, cancer.
- Henk Nijdam, 73, Dutch road bicycle racer, track pursuit world champion (1962).
- David Picão, 85, Brazilian Roman Catholic prelate, bishop of Santos (1996–2000).
- Ron Richards, 80, British record producer.
- Raymond J. Saulnier, 100, American economist.
