= Kathryn Blacker =

British curator

Kathryn Lindsay Blacker is the Chief Executive of York Museums Trust.

She studied MA modern history at St Peter's College, Oxford. She worked as a producer for BBC Sport and was Deputy Director of the National Media Museum before, in 2013, joining York Minster as Chapter Steward. In August 2022 she was announced as the new CEO of York Museums Trust, succeeding Reyahn King in the role.

Blacker is a governor of the Pathfinder Multi-Academy Trust.
