= Kamisaka =

Kamisaka (written: 上坂 or 神坂) is a Japanese surname. Notable people with the surname include:

- Fuyuko Kamisaka (上坂 冬子, 1930–2009), Japanese writer
- Kamisaka Sekka (神坂 雪佳, 1866–1942), Japanese painter
