= York Museums Trust =

Charity operating museums and galleries in the City of York, North Yorkshire, England

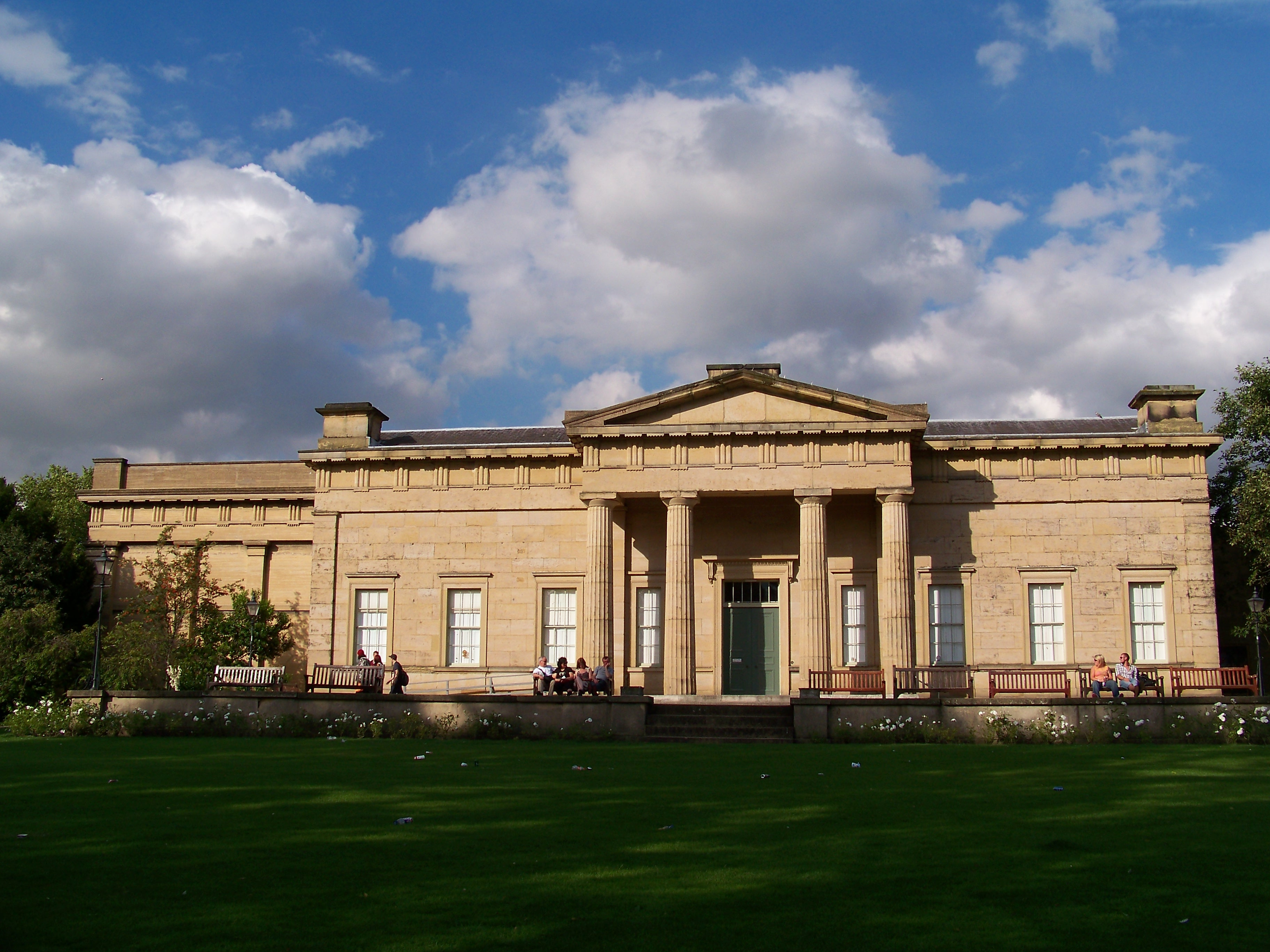
- The Yorkshire Museum, one of the trust's sites.
- Founded: 26 February 2002
- Founder: Robin Guthrie, Michael John Allen, David E Rayner, R E Rushforth
- Dissolved: N/A
- Type: Charity
- Registration no.: 1092466
- Purpose: "Our Mission is to cherish the collections, buildings and gardens entrusted to us, presenting and interpreting them as a stimulus for learning, a provocation to curiosity and a source of inspiration and enjoyment for all."
- Location: York, England
- Origins: Created by City of York Council to manage the city's museums and galleries
- Region served: Yorkshire
- Services: Operating York's city-owned museums and galleries
- Key people: Chair Dr Angela Dean Chief Executive Kathryn Blacker
- Employees: 101 (as of 1 November 2020)
- Volunteers: 352 (2016)
- Website: www.yorkmuseumstrust.org.uk

York Museums Trust (YMT) is the charity responsible for operating some key museums and galleries in York, England. The trust was founded in 2002 to run York's museums on behalf of the City of York Council. It has seen an increase in annual footfall of 254,000 to the venues since its foundation. In both 2016 and 2017, it saw its annual visitors numbers reach 500,000 people.

== History and operations ==
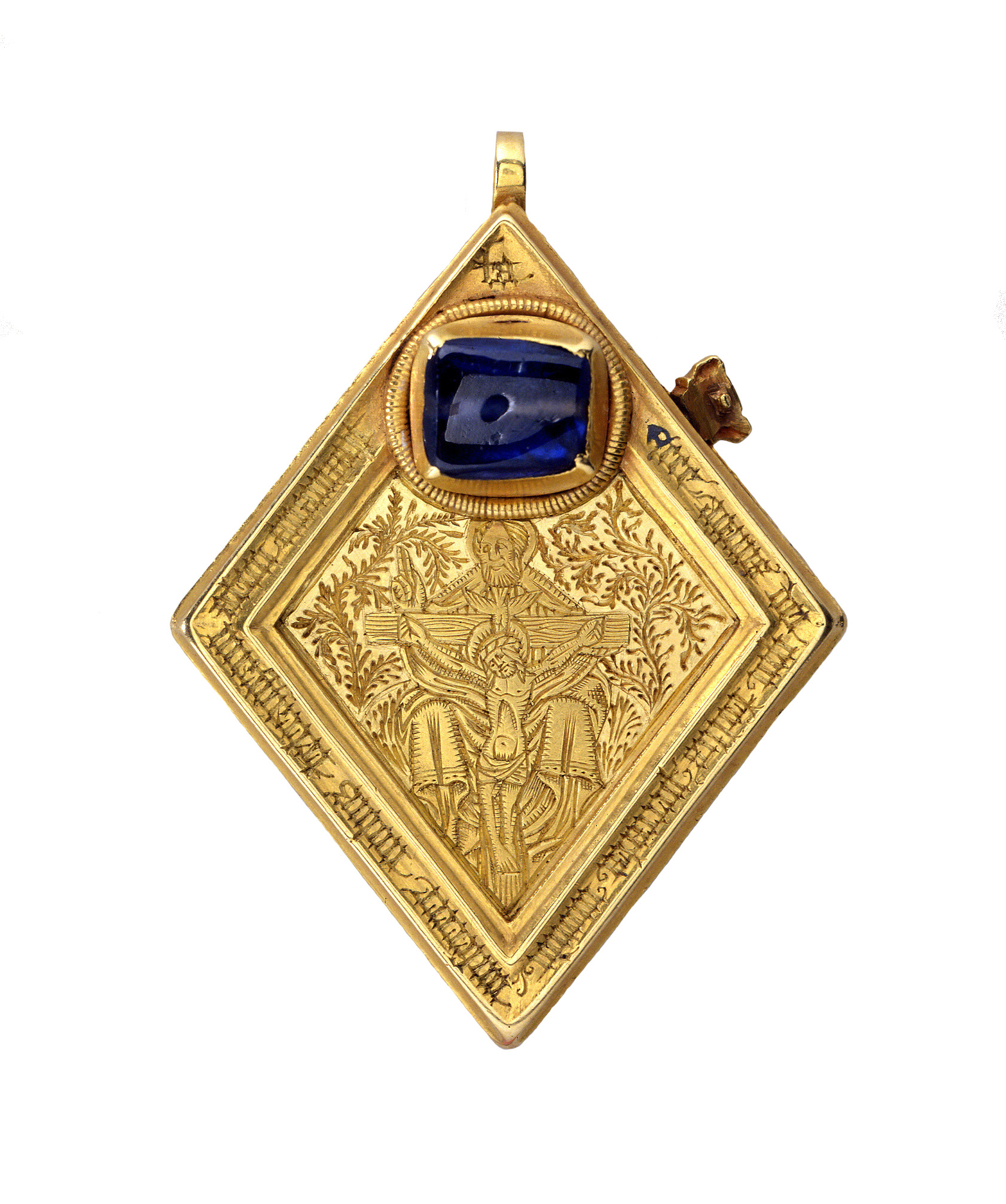
Middleham Jewel

- The trust was founded on 1 August 2002. On 3 October 2002 it took control of the sites. Many of the staff who had been working in the museums and galleries under the City of York council transferred across to the new organisation.
- In 2009 jointly acquired with the British Museum the Vale of York Hoard, a Viking treasure hoard valued at over £1,000,000.
- An exhibition in 2011 of David Hockney’s largest landscape painting Bigger Trees Near Warter was the best-attended since the Trust had taken over the York Art gallery in 2002.
- In 2012 the Trust successfully raised enough money to retain one of a pair of Iron Age gold torcs that had been found in Towton, North Yorkshire.
- A number of objects with a Yorkshire connection and held by the Trust were included in the BBC History of the World project, including the Middleham Jewel, the York helmet, and a tin of Rowntree's cocoa from Ernest Shackleton’s unsuccessful Nimrod expedition to the South Pole.
- In 2013 the Trust in conjunction with the BBC organised a Stargazing Live event at the York Observatory in the York museum gardens.
- In 2014 an exhibition at York Castle Museum focussed on the changes brought about by the First World War, in the centenary year of the start of the conflict.
- In 2015 Janet Barnes, the founding Chief Executive of YMT retired. Reyahn King was appointed as her successor.
- King stepped down in summer 2022 to move to National Trust for Scotland. YMT announced her replacement, Kathryn Blacker, on 30 August 2022.

=== Funding ===
The Trust is primarily funded through the City of York Council and the Arts Council. The Trust also derives substantial revenue from admission charges and other income sources. Total funding and income for 2013/14 is expected to be £5.85 million.

On 4 November 2022 the Arts Council announced its continued support of York Museums Trust as a National Portfolio Organisation as part of the 2023-2026 investment programme.

YMT's annual report for the City of York Council in 2023 highlighted that the Trust expected to make a loss of approximately £300,000 in the financial year 2022/23 because of the ongoing impact of the Covid-19 pandemic and the Cost of Living Crisis on visitor figures, donations, and secondary spending at its venues.

=== Governance ===
York Museums Trust is led by a CEO, supported by directors and other senior staff. They are responsible to the Trustees.

Directors of York Museums Trust
Name	Dates in post	Role
Janet Barnes	2002–2015	CEO
Mary Kershaw	2003-2009	Director of Collections
Reyahn King	2015–2022	CEO
Kathryn Blacker	2022–	CEO

Trustees of York Museums Trust as of August 2025
Name	Date Appointed	Role
Dr Angela Dean	2014	Chair
Nicole Fowler		
Justine Andrew		
Jonny Crawshaw		
Azra Kirkby		
David Lamb		
Scott Furlong	2020	
Andrew Scott	2020	
Robert Newport		
Keith Nesbitt		

=== COVID-19 pandemic ===
- On 18 March 2020 the Trust announced that it was closing all of its sites due to the COVID-19 pandemic.
- On 28 July it announced that it had a £1.5 million shortfall in its finances due to the pandemic and, despite emergency funding from Arts Council England, it warned of possible job losses resulting from the prolonged closure of its venues. An August report sent to the City of York Council requesting additional funds to ensure the continued operation of the Trust warned that the failure to do so would result in the closure of all York Museum Trust sites and the reversion of ownership to the council.
- On 13 October 2020 the Trust announced that it has been awarded £850,000 as part of the Culture Recovery Fund from the UK government.
- On 2 November 2020 the Trust announced that it was due to close the York Art Gallery and York Castle Museum from 5 November as part of new national restrictions in England.
- On 10 November 2020 the Trust announced that it has finalised the restructure of the organisation in an effort to close a £570,000 shortfall in its finances as a result of the COVID-19 pandemic. 26 members of staff were made redundant and 17 members of staff took voluntary redundancy. As of 1 November 2020 the Trust employs 101 people.
- The Castle Museum and Art Gallery reopened on 2 December 2020. The Yorkshire Museum remained closed.
- York was moved into Tier 3 Restrictions on 31 December 2020, forcing the Art Gallery and Castle Museum to close.
- On 28 March 2021 the Yorkshire Museum announced that it has received an additional £18,000 'Lifeline grant' from the Culture Recovery Fund for repairs to the building façade and roof.
- In March 2021 it was announced that the Art Gallery would reopen on 28 May to coincide with the launch of a new exhibition 'Grayson Perry: The Pre-Therapy Years' and that the Castle Museum would also reopen in May.
- On 2 April 2021 the Trust announced that it had received £423,000 from the second round of funding of the Culture Recovery Fund.
- On 7 May 2021 it announced the reopening of the Yorkshire Museum on the 9 July 2021 with an exhibition featuring a portrait of Richard III of England from the National Portrait Gallery.

== Sites ==
The trust runs four cultural venues and a garden.

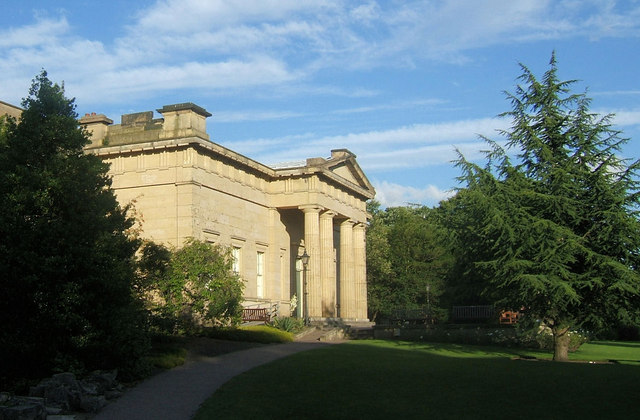
The Yorkshire Museum

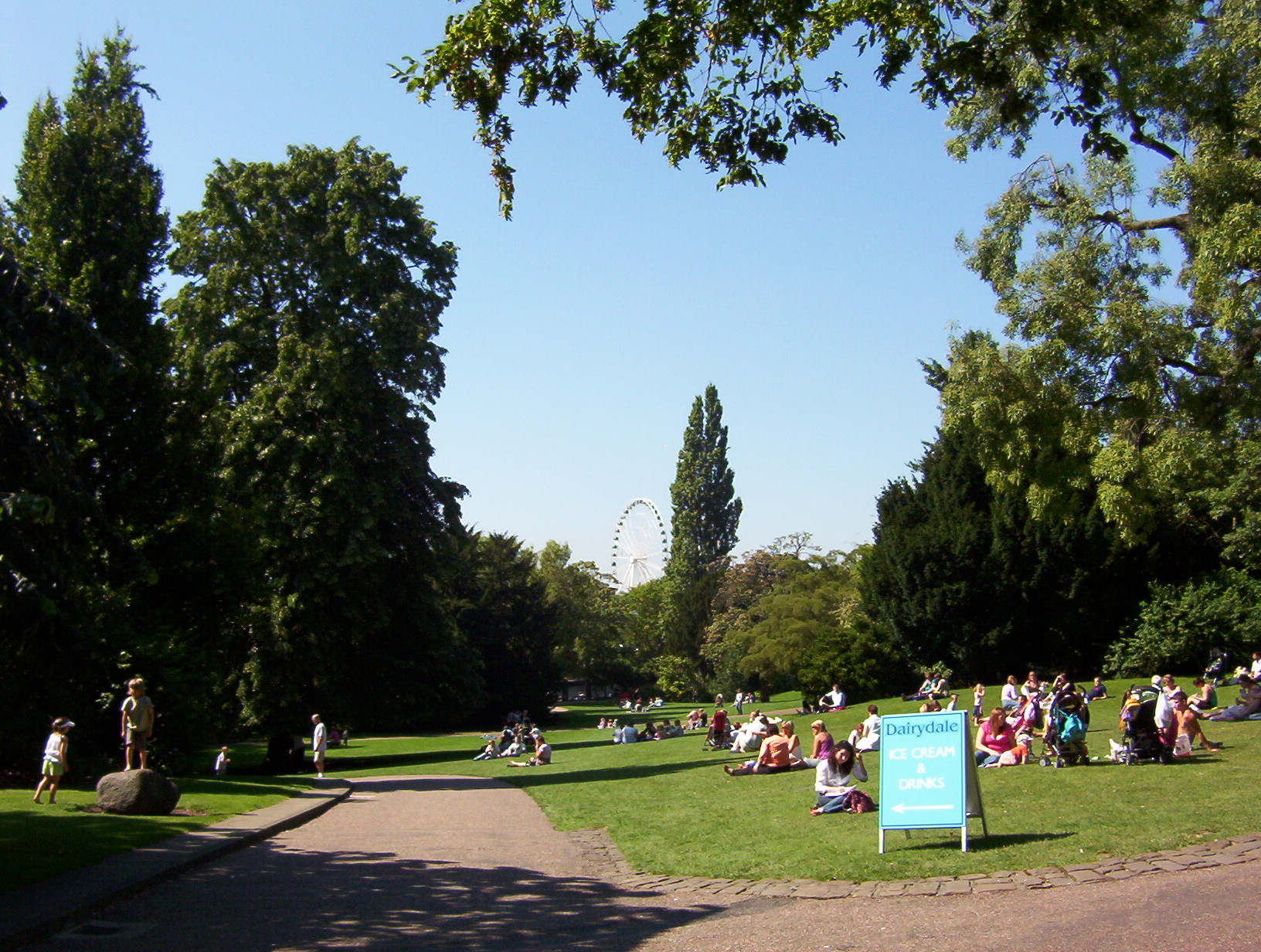
York Museum Gardens

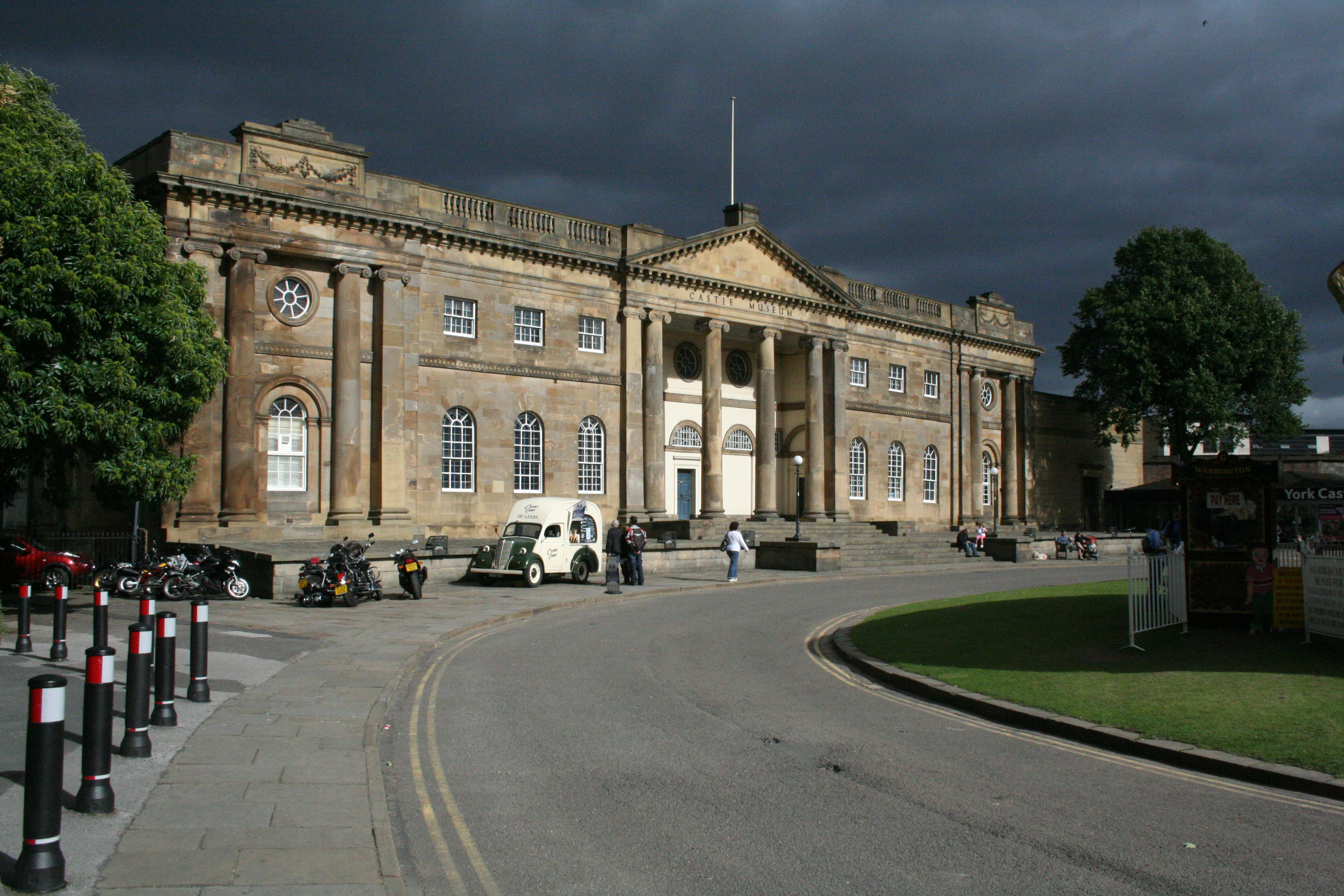
The Castle Museum

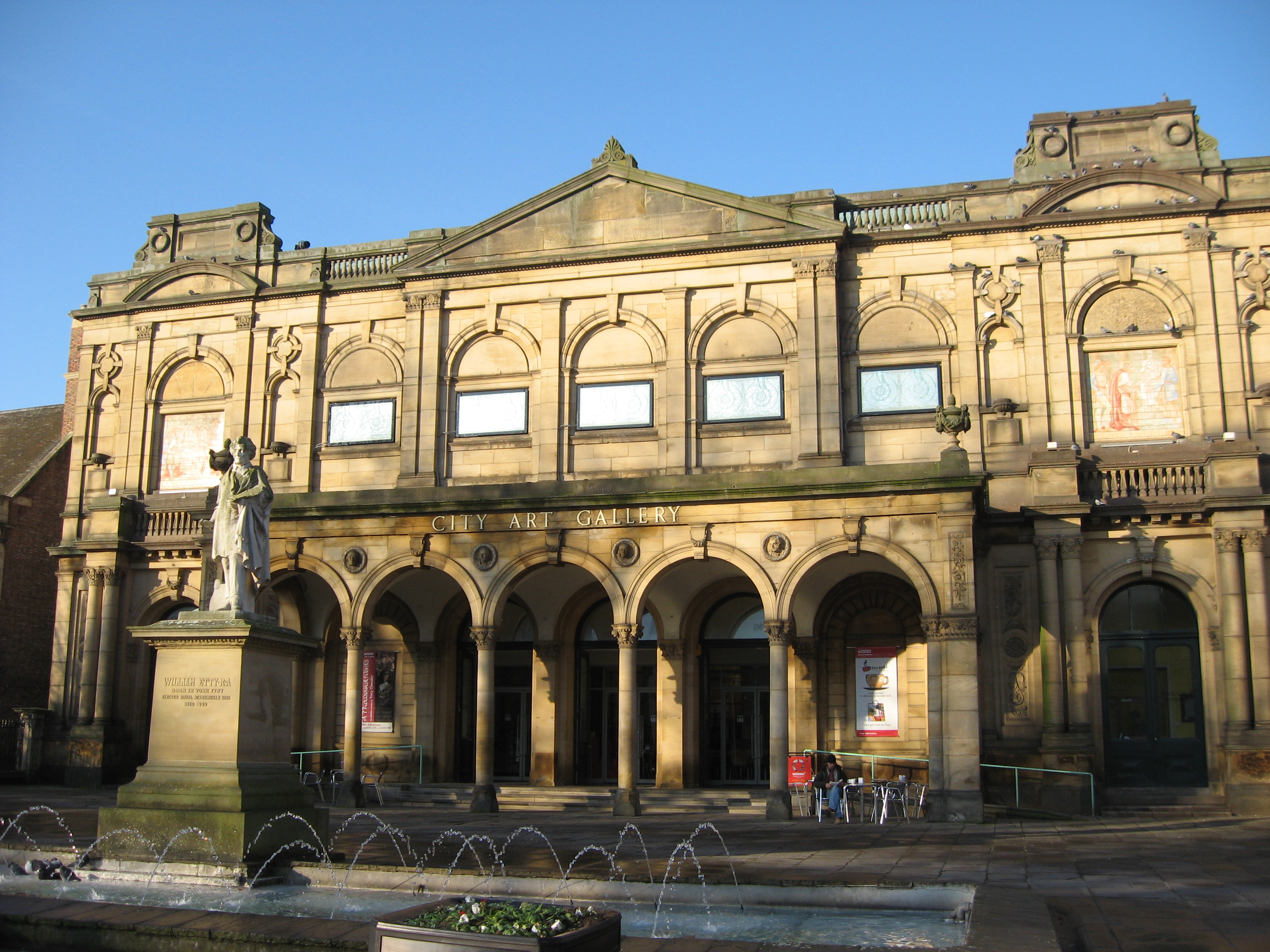
York City Art Gallery

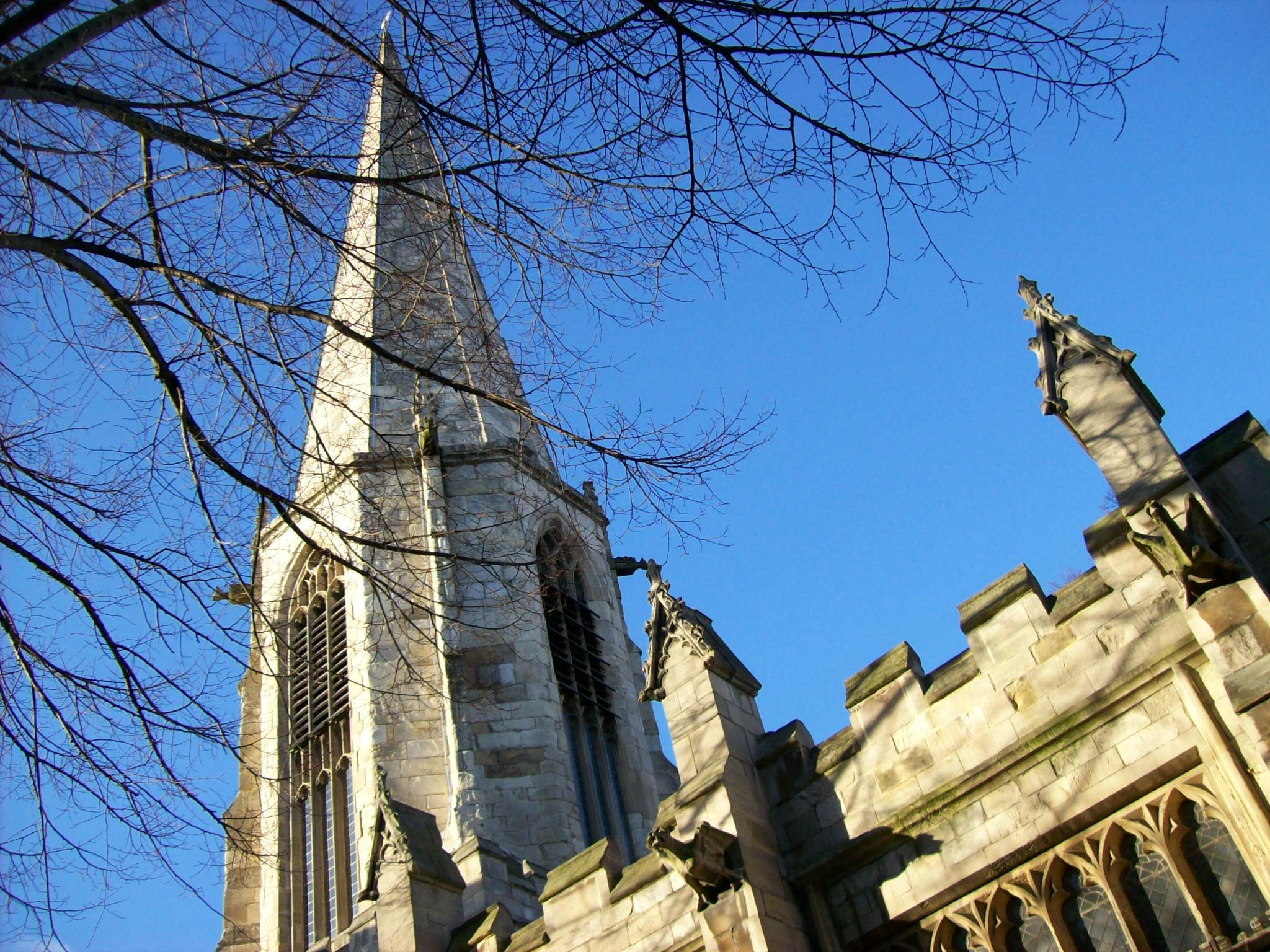
St Mary's (contemporary art space)

=== The Yorkshire Museum ===
This is the historic county museum displaying collections inherited from the Yorkshire Philosophical Society and acting as a regional collecting museum.

=== York Museum Gardens ===
The Museum Gardens are a botanical garden containing the Yorkshire Museum and St Mary's Abbey.

=== York Castle Museum ===
The Castle Museum is a social history museum housed in two former prison buildings.

=== York Art Gallery ===
York's Art Gallery has a large collection of paintings and an internationally important collection of studio ceramics. In 2012 the trust obtained £7 million of funding for major refurbishment of the gallery. Over 1000 nationally important paintings held by the Trust have been made available online as part of a cooperative project with the BBC and the Public Catalogue Foundation.

=== York St Mary's ===
York St Mary's is a contemporary art space in the deconsecrated church of St Mary's, Castlegate. The first use of the space was a joint exhibition by a number of artists, but since 2005 St Mary's has hosted installations by individuals, which are changed on a regular basis. The first of these commissions, inspired by the medieval building itself, was a textile work by Caroline Broadhead called Breathing Spaces. This was followed by Echo, a work by Susie MacMurray. In 2012, Laura Belem created The Temple of a Thousand Bells, which used individually-made clear glass bells in a composition combining bell chimes with a narrative describing how a temple sinks into the sea, silencing the music of a thousand bells.
