= Fuyuko =

- Gender: Female

Origin
- Origin: Japanese
- Meaning: Different meanings depending on the kanji used

Fuyuko (written: 冬子 lit. "winter child" or 芙由子) is a feminine Japanese given name. Notable people with the name include:

- Fuyuko Kamisaka (上坂 冬子; 1930–2009), Japanese non-fiction author
- Fuyuko Matsui (松井 冬子; born 1974), Japanese painter
- Fuyuko Tachizaki (立崎 芙由子; born 1989), Japanese biathlete
