= Germán Martínez =

Germán Martínez may refer to:

- Germán Martínez (Mexican politician) (born 1967), Mexican politician
- Germán Martínez (Argentine politician) (born 1975), Argentine politician
- Germán Martínez (swimmer) (born 1979), Colombian swimmer
- Germán Martínez Hidalgo (1929–2009), Mexican scientist
