= Proclamation of the republic in Germany =

1918 political event in Germany

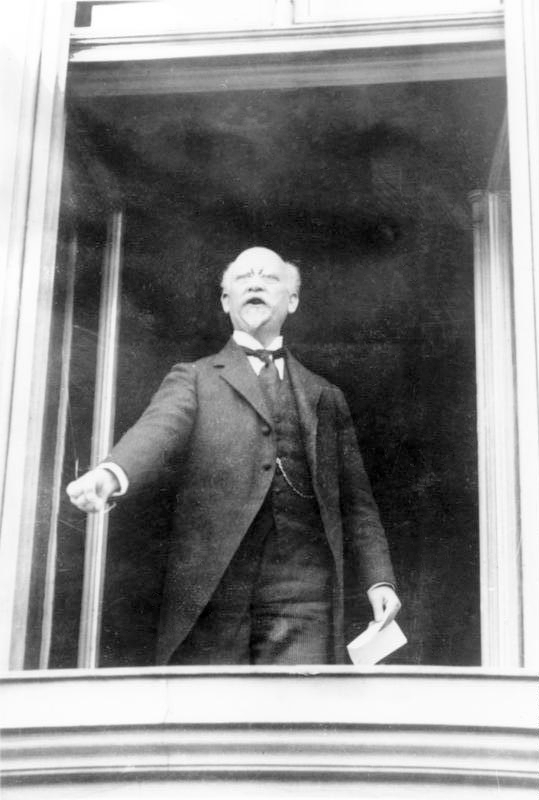
Philipp Scheidemann proclaims the republic from the Reichstag building on 9 November 1918.

The proclamation of the republic in Germany took place in Berlin twice on 9 November 1918, the first at the Reichstag building by Philipp Scheidemann of the Majority Social Democratic Party of Germany (MSPD) and the second a few hours later by Karl Liebknecht, the leader of the Marxist Spartacus League, at the Berlin Palace.

In the German Revolution of 1918–1919, during which Social Democrats and Spartacists were among the groups that fought to determine the country's future form of government, it was the MSPD and the ideas of the bourgeois-democratic parties that prevailed over the Spartacists and their more radical idea of a soviet-style republic. The German Empire was transformed from a monarchy into a parliamentary democratic republic with a liberal constitution. Scheidemann's speech marked the point at which the Empire could be said to have ended and the Weimar Republic born.

== Background ==
The leadership of the MSPD had seen its long-standing demands for a democratization of the Reich addressed by the October 1918 constitutional reforms. The amendment to Constitution of the German Empire turned the German Reich into a parliamentary monarchy in which the government was no longer answerable to the emperor but to the majority in the Reichstag. Because of the constitutional change, the MSPD was at first willing to preserve the monarchical form of government as such, in part because it was concerned with continuity and wanted an accommodation with the elites of the Empire. The party leadership, however, soon began to push for the abdication of Emperor Wilhelm II, whose position had become untenable due to his responsibility for Germany's defeat in World War I. But the Emperor, who had been at the army's General Headquarters in Spa, Belgium since 29 October, kept postponing the decision.

On the evening of 8 November, MSPD leadership in Berlin learned that the Independent Social Democratic Party (USPD), a more antiwar and left-leaning breakaway from the original Social Democratic Party (SPD), had called for meetings and mass demonstrations on the following day. It was to be expected that they would demand not only the abdication of the Emperor but also the abolition of the monarchy altogether. To forestall the demands, the last Reich chancellor of the Empire, Prince Max von Baden, at the urging of MSPD chairman Friedrich Ebert, announced the abdication of Wilhelm II on the morning of 9 November, before he had in fact abdicated. The declaration stated:

The Emperor and King has decided to abdicate the throne. The Reich Chancellor will remain in office until the questions connected with the Emperor's abdication, the renunciation of the throne by the Crown Prince of the German Empire and of Prussia, and the installation of a regency have been settled.

After the Emperor learned of the announcement, he and his family fled into exile in the Netherlands where, on 28 November 1918, he and Crown Prince Wilhelm signed the document of abdication. At noon on 9 November Max von Baden, acting in violation of the constitution, unilaterally transferred the office of Reich chancellor to Friedrich Ebert. He in turn asked von Baden to act as imperial regent until a successor to Wilhelm II as German emperor had been appointed. Even though von Baden refused the offer, Ebert continued to assume that he could save the monarchy.

== Scheidemann's proclamation ==
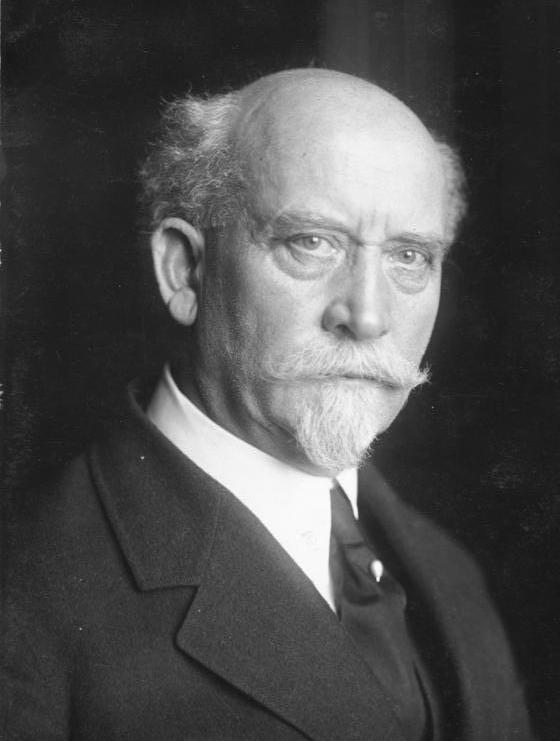
Philipp Scheidemann

The announcement of the abdication from the throne came too late to make any impression on the demonstrators in Berlin. Instead of dispersing, as the SPD newspaper Vorwärts urged them to do, more and more people poured into the center of Berlin and demonstrated between the seat of the emperor at the Berlin Palace, the seat of the Reich government on Wilhelmstrasse, and the Reichstag building.

In the dining room of the Reichstag building, Philipp Scheidemann, who had been state secretary under Max von Baden since 3 October and was one of the first Social Democrats to hold a government post in Germany, sat eating lunch at a separate table from Friedrich Ebert. While there Scheidemann learned that Karl Liebknecht intended to proclaim a soviet republic shortly. Scheidemann thought that if the MSPD wanted to retain the initiative, it had to get ahead of its opponents on the left. Therefore, shortly after 2 p.m. – according to his own account "between soup and dessert" – he stepped up to the second window of the second floor north of the main portal of the Reichstag building and proclaimed the republic. Immediately thereafter, back in the dining room, Scheidemann got into a heated argument with Ebert over Scheidemann's unauthorized action. Ebert pounded on a table in his anger at Scheidemann. "You have no right to proclaim the republic! What becomes of Germany, a republic or any other form, is for the constituent assembly to decide!"

On 9 November 1918, under the headline "Proclamation of the Republic", the Vossische Zeitung quoted Scheidemann's speech as follows:

We have triumphed all along the line; the old is no more. Ebert has been appointed Reich chancellor, and Lieutenant Göhre, a Reichstag member, has been assigned to the minister of war. The task now is to consolidate the victory we have won; nothing can prevent us from doing so. The Hohenzollerns have abdicated. See to it that nothing sullies this proud day. Let it be a day of honor forever in the history of Germany. Long live the German Republic.

The Austrian journalist Ernst Friedegg, who had recorded the speech stenographically, published it in 1919 in the German Revolutionary Almanac with slightly different wording:

The German people have triumphed all along the line. The old rottenness has collapsed; militarism is finished! The Hohenzollerns have abdicated! Long live the German Republic! The parliamentary deputy Ebert has been proclaimed chancellor of the Reich. Ebert has been charged with putting together a new government. This government will include all socialist parties.

Now our task is not to let this brilliant victory, this full victory of the German people, be sullied, and therefore I ask you to see to it that security is not disrupted! We must be able to be proud of this day in all future times! Nothing must happen that we can be reproached with later! Calm, order and security are what we need now!

The military governor of Berlin and Brandenburg, Alexander von Linsingen, and the minister of war, Scheuch, will each have a representative attached. The party representative Göhre will countersign all decrees of Minister of War Scheuch. So, from now on, respect the decrees signed by Ebert and the proclamations signed with the names of Göhre and Scheuch.

See to it that the new German Republic which we are going to establish is not endangered by anything. Long live the German Republic.

In contrast, the version of the speech that Scheidemann recorded on a phonograph disk on 9 January 1920 and that was reproduced in his memoirs in 1928, shows significant deviations from the texts of the contemporaneous sources:

Workers and soldiers! The four years of war were terrible, the sacrifices in possessions and blood that the people had to make were horrific. The ill-fated war has come to an end; the killing is over. The consequences of the war – hardship and misery – will burden us for many years to come. We have not been spared the defeat that we wanted to prevent at all costs. Our proposals for negotiations were sabotaged, we ourselves were ridiculed and slandered. The enemies of the working people, the true internal enemies who are to blame for Germany's collapse, have become silent and invisible. They were the home warriors who perpetuated their demands for conquest until yesterday, just as they waged the most bitter fight against any reform of the constitution and especially of the shameful Prussian electoral system. These enemies of the people are hopefully finished for good.

The Emperor has abdicated; he and his friends have disappeared. The people have triumphed over them all along the line! Prince Max of Baden has handed the Reich chancellorship to Deputy Ebert. Our friend will form a workers' government to which all socialist parties will belong. The new government must not be disrupted in its efforts towards peace and its concern for work and bread.

Workers and soldiers! Be conscious of the historical significance of this day. Unheard-of things have taken place! Great and immense work is ahead of us.

Everything for the people, everything by the people! Nothing must be done to bring dishonor to the workers' movement. Be united, be faithful and do your duty!

The old and rotten, the monarchy has collapsed. Long live the new; long live the German Republic!

Scheidemann's text was considered authentic until the historian Manfred Jessen-Klingenberg, in a source-critical analysis in 1968, was able to plausibly prove the authorship and reliability of Friedegg's anonymously published stenographic notes. Jessen-Klingenberg concluded that Scheidemann had "handed down a self-written forgery of his speech. Admittedly, he had understandable personal and political reasons for this." Scheidemann had clearly wanted to assign the blame for the defeat in the war to the opponents of a negotiated peace and by so doing react to the political defamation of the Social Democrats by the perpetrators of the stab-in-the-back myth who claimed that the war had been lost on the home front by the Left and the Jews, not on the battlefield. Jessen-Klingenberg's interpretation is still considered "not outdated" even after more than fifty years.

== Liebknecht's proclamation ==
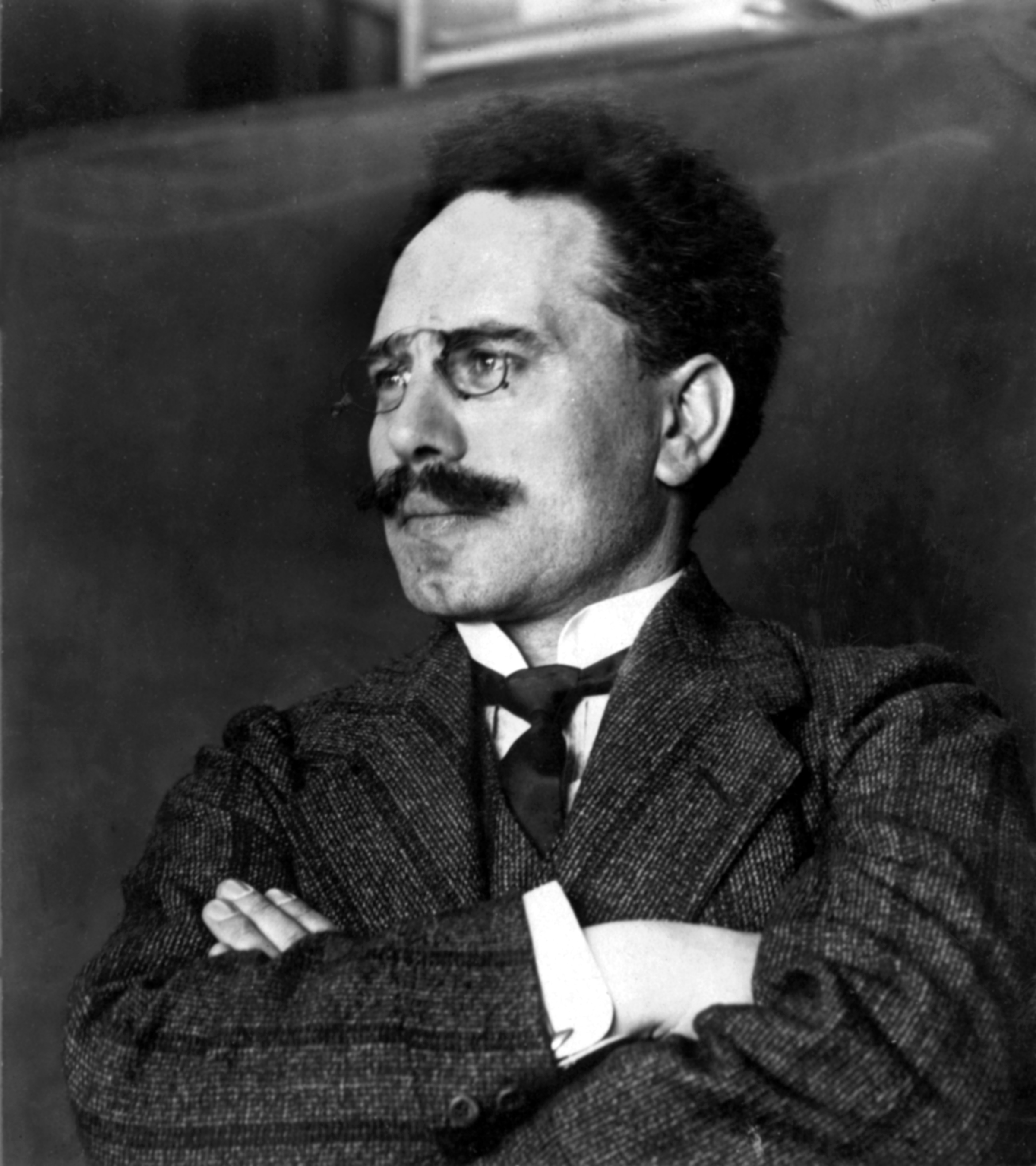
Karl Liebknecht

In the afternoon of 9 November 1918 at about 4 p.m., Karl Liebknecht proclaimed the "Free Socialist Republic of Germany" in the Lustgarten in front of the Berlin Palace. Standing on the roof of a vehicle, he said:

The day of revolution has come. We have compelled the peace. At this moment peace is concluded. The old is no more. The rule of the Hohenzollerns, who for centuries lived in this palace, is over. In this hour we proclaim the Free Socialist Republic of Germany. We salute our Russian brothers who four days ago were shamefully chased away ... Through this gate will enter the new socialist freedom of workers and soldiers. We want to raise the red flag of the Free Republic of Germany on the site where the emperor's standard flew!

After the troops surrounding the Palace had abandoned their posts in the face of the growing crowd, Liebknecht spoke a second time from the large window of Portal IV directly above the gate. The speech was reproduced in the Vossische Zeitung as follows:

"Party comrades, ... the day of freedom has dawned. Never again will a Hohenzollern set foot on this square. Seventy years ago, Frederick William IV stood here on the same spot and had to take off his cap in the face of the procession of those who had fallen on the barricades of Berlin for the cause of freedom, in the face of fifty blood-covered corpses. Another procession is passing by here today. They are the ghosts of the millions who gave their lives for the sacred cause of the proletariat. With split skulls, bathed in blood, these victims of tyranny stagger by, and they are followed by the ghosts of millions of women and children who perished in grief and misery for the cause of the proletariat. And millions and millions of blood sacrifices to the world war follow them. Today an immense crowd of enthusiastic proletarians stands in the same place to pay homage to the new freedom. Party comrades, I proclaim the Free Socialist Republic of Germany, which shall embrace all communities, in which there will be no more servants, in which every honest worker will find the honest reward for his labor. The rule of capitalism, which has turned Europe into a field of corpses, is broken. We call back our Russian brothers. They said to us when they left: 'If you have not achieved in a month what we have achieved, we will turn our backs on you.' And now it has taken barely four days. Even though the old has been torn down, ... we must not believe that our task is done. We must exert all our forces to build the government of the workers and soldiers and create a new state order of the proletariat, an order of peace, happiness and freedom for our German brothers and our brothers throughout the world. We extend our hands to them and call upon them to complete the world revolution. Whoever among you wants to see the Free Socialist Republic of Germany and the world revolution fulfilled, raise his hand in oath."

All hands rose and shouts resounded: "Hail the Republic!" After the applause died away, a soldier standing next to Liebknecht ... shouted: "Long live its first president, Liebknecht!" Liebknecht then concluded:

"We are not there yet. President or not, we must all stand together to realize the ideal of the republic. Hail to freedom and happiness and peace!"

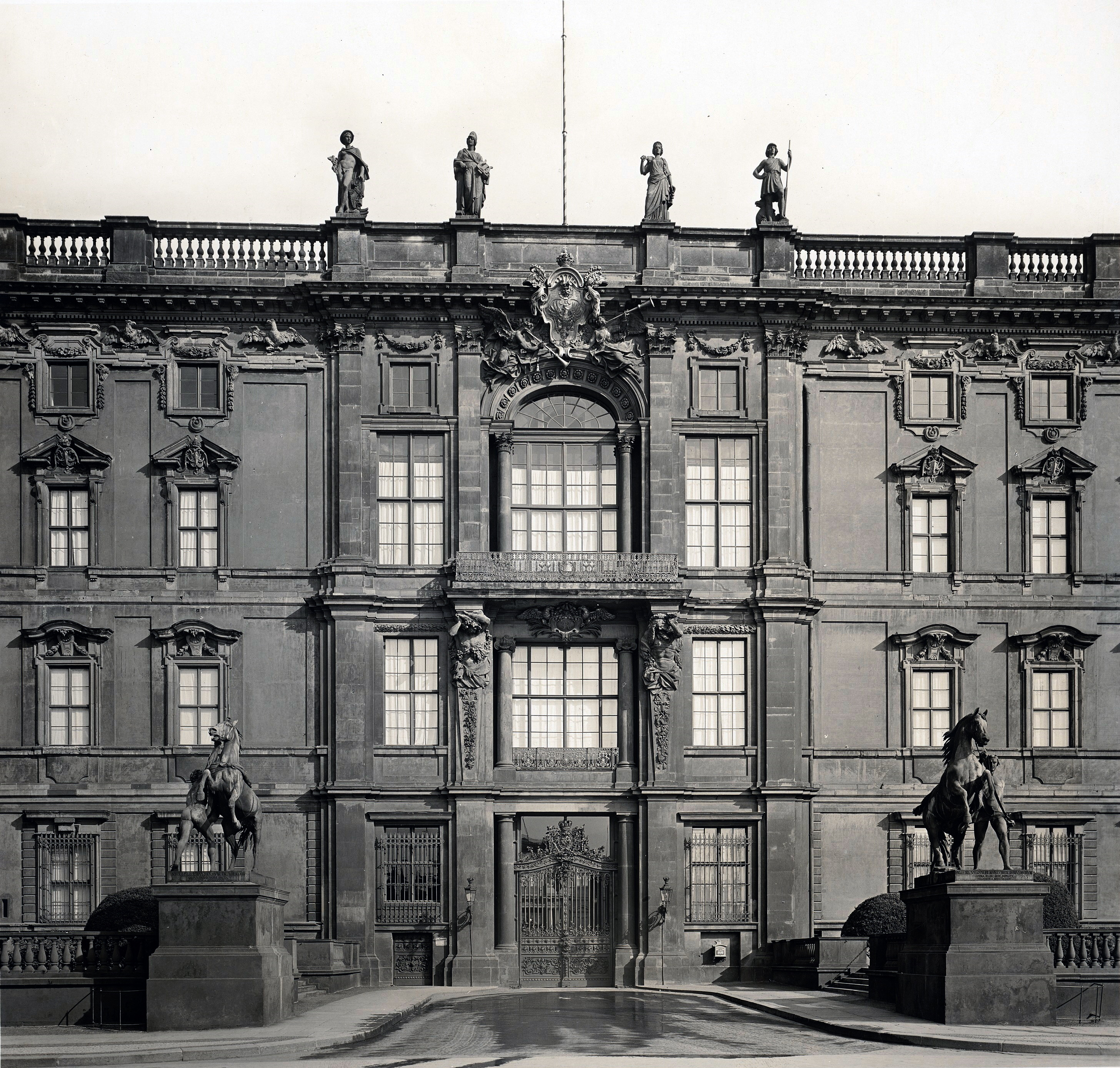
Berlin Palace, Portal IV. From the large window directly above the gate, Liebknecht proclaimed the socialist republic.

The Berlin newspapers reported on Liebknecht's proclamation even more extensively than on Scheidemann's speech. His words, however, did not have a lasting effect since the left wing of the revolutionaries did not have a sufficient power base and continued to lose influence after the suppression of the Spartacist uprising in January 1919. It was not until the German Democratic Republic (East Germany) was founded in 1949 that Liebknecht's proclamation was included in one part of Germany's tradition-building. Portal IV of the Berlin Palace was salvaged during the building's post-war demolition and integrated into the new State Council building as the "Liebknecht Portal".

== Aftermath ==
The MSPD leadership initially succeeded in persuading the USPD to join them in an interim government, the Council of the People's Deputies. The three USPD members resigned from the council on 29 December 1918 due to disagreements with the MSPD and were replaced by two additional MSPD members. January 1919 saw the Spartacist uprising, in the course of which the MSPD leadership deployed right-wing Freikorps troops against the left-wing revolutionaries. On 19 January, elections were held for the Weimar National Assembly. It drafted the Weimar Constitution which came into force on 11 August 1919. Article 1 begins with the sentence, "The German Reich is a republic". Despite both the strong desire among many Germans to restore the monarchy and the failure in 1933 of the Weimar Republic, there were never any serious efforts to return to an imperial form of government.

In the course of the Spartacist uprising, on 15 January 1919, Karl Liebknecht and Rosa Luxemburg were murdered, with Friedrich Ebert's approval, by members of the Guard Cavalry Rifle Division. Scheidemann became a hated figure in German nationalist and ethnic circles. An assassination attempt was made on him in 1922. After Adolf Hitler seized power in 1933, he fled into exile in Denmark. His name was on the first expatriation list of the Nazi regime on August 25, 1933. Scheidemann died in Copenhagen in 1939.

== See also ==
- Proclamation of the German Empire
- Foundation of East Germany
