= Mary Kershaw =

American museum curator and director

- Born: Philadelphia, USA

Academic background
- Education: University of Pennsylvania; University College London

Academic work
- Discipline: Museums
- Institutions: Harrogate Museums; York Museums Trust; New Mexico Museum of Art; Museum of Northern Arizona

Mary Kershaw is an American museum curator and director.

== Biography ==
Kershaw studied at the University of Pennsylvania and University College London before being appointed as an assistant curator at Harrogate's museums. She was the curator at the museums service from 1992 to 2003, overseeing redevelopments of the Mercer Gallery, Knaresborough Castle, St Robert's Cave, and the Royal Pump Room Museum.

She was appointed the Director of Collections at the newly formed York Museums Trust in 2003. She left this post in 2009 to return to the USA as the director of the New Mexico Museum of Art. In June 2019 she was appointed director of the Museum of Northern Arizona.

Kershaw is a Fellow of the Museums Association.
