= Janet Barnes =

British curator

Janet Barnes CBE
- Occupations: Museum Curator; Director

Janet Barnes, CBE is a British curator and former museum director. She was the chief executive officer of York Museums Trust from its founding in 2002 to 2015.

== Career ==
Barnes was the Honorary Curator of the Turner Museum of Glass at the University of Sheffield from 1979 to 1999. During her time in Sheffield she had a variety of curatorial and management roles in Sheffield Galleries and Museums, including opening the Ruskin Gallery and Ruskin Craft Gallery, which housed the educational collection of John Ruskin.

Barnes was the Director of the Crafts Council from 1999 to 2002 and, from 2005 until 2013, was the chairperson of Arts Council England in Yorkshire and a member of the National Council. She is a member of the National Heritage Memorial Fund committee and a member of the Humanities External Advisory Board for Oxford University. Barnes was the CEO of York Museums Trust from its founding in 2002 to November 2015. She was succeeded in the role by Reyahn King.

Barnes is a Director of John Ruskin's educational charity the Guild of St George, a Trustee of the Anthony Shaw Collection Trust and a member of the Challenge Committee for the DCMS Museum Review.

== Awards ==
Barnes has been awarded three honorary doctorates for work in the Museums and Arts: from the University of Sheffield (2000), Sheffield Hallam University (2001), and the University of York (2013).

Barnes was appointed a Commander of the Order of the British Empire (CBE) in the 2014 New Year Honours for services to museums.

== Publications ==
- Barnes, J. 1982. Percy Horton, 1897-1970, artist & absolutist. Sheffield: Graves Art Gallery.
- Barnes, J. 1984. J.G. Graves : Sheffield businessman, art collector and benefactor. Sheffield: Graves Art Gallery.
- Barnes, J. 1985. Ruskin in Sheffield: The Ruskin Gallery, Collection of the Guild of St. George, Sheffield. Sheffield.
- Barnes, J. 1986. The decorative paintings of Harry E Allen, (1894-1958). Sheffield: Sheffield Arts Department.
