= Richard Baker (American businessman, born 1946) =

Richard "Dick" Baker (September 3, 1946 – April 14, 2009) was an American businessman and surf apparel executive for Ocean Pacific. Baker helped to shape the surf apparel industry as president and chief executive of Ocean Pacific, also known as OP.

== Biography ==
=== Early life ===
Baker was born on September 3, 1946, in Los Angeles. He grew up in the San Fernando Valley and earned his bachelor's degree from California State University, Northridge.

=== Career ===
Baker first entered the apparel industry as a college student. He became a buyer at a men's specialty store to pay for school. He later became a buyer for the now defunct Bullock's department store.

Baker became head of the Marithé François Girbaud's U.S. division, based in New York City, in 1980. He gradually moved on to head other clothing brands. In 1983, Baker became the president and chief executive of Izod Ltd.'s menswear division. He became president of Esprit Sport in 1986 before later moving on to become the head of Tommy Hilfiger's women's clothing division.

=== Ocean Pacific ===
In 1998, Baker and his partners at the Doyle & Boissiere investment group, which is based in Burlingame, California, acquired the Ocean Pacific heritage surf brand. Ocean Pacific was in financial trouble at the time as consumer preferences had changed over the years.

Baker became the chief executive of Ocean Pacific following the 1998 acquisition. He was able to successfully revive the flagging label. Under his helm, Baker led Ocean Pacific through two sales. The first was to Warnaco Group in 2004, which acquired Ocean Pacific for $40 million. The second sale, in 2006, was to Iconix Brand Group, a surf wear maker, for an estimated $54 million.

Baker remained the president of Ocean Pacific until he stepped down in 2006, and continued as a consultant with the company until 2007.

=== Surf Industry Manufacturers Association ===
Baker joined the board of directors of the Surf Industry Manufacturers Association (SIMA), based in Aliso Viejo, California, in 2000 while he was the chief executive of Ocean Pacific. He served as the head of SIMA for nine years before becoming the chairman emeritus of the organization. The Los Angeles Times noted that as head of SIMA, Baker directed the business of "selling surf to the suits" in the larger business community. He also served as a mentor to the CEOs and heads of other surf oriented apparel brands. Fernando Aguerre, the co-founder of Reef clothing company and current chief executive of Liquid Tribe, later called Baker, "part father, part brother and part friend."

In a speech to a surf industry gathering in San José del Cabo, Mexico, in May 2005, Baker told attendees that, "Surf is on the world stage, and this hard-core, laid-back industry has been discovered by the suits. The non- endemic business types see this as an area of growth, and if you see this as a threat, then get a life -- it's a compliment."

Baker also told the surf industry to use their influence to do good works saying in 2006, "Pick your spot and make a difference...Whether you're big or small, give back what you can."

=== Death ===
Richard Baker died on April 14, 2009, at Mission Hospital in Mission Viejo, California, after a two-year battle with cancer. He was 62 years old and was survived by his wife of 19 years, Una Baker; sons, Ryan and Jack; his father, Donald Baker, and his sister, Donna Smith Vigil.

The Surf Industry Manufacturers Association announced that its plans to honor Baker with its Lifetime Achievement Award at its 20th annual Waterman's Ball in August 2009.

Richard Woolcott, the founder and CEO of Volcom told the LA Times, "Dick was a great friend, mentor and role model to many of us in the industry. He understood the magic of action sports and helped us harness it into big-picture thinking and execution. But most of all, he was a wonderful human being with a loving heart and spirit. He was always supportive in what we were doing, lending his advice and positive feedback. He was a blessing to this industry and will be deeply missed."

Fernando Aguerre, founder of Reef, said in reaction to Baker's death, "And I feel like an orphan today."
