= Mark I. Levy =

American lawyer

Mark I. Levy (June 28, 1949 – April 30, 2009) was an American lawyer who was a former deputy assistant attorney general in the United States Department of Justice, a former assistant to the Solicitor General of the United States, and a successful appellate attorney. In his career, he argued 16 cases before the Supreme Court of the United States.

== Early life and education ==
Levy earned a bachelor's degree summa cum laude and honors for exceptional distinction from Yale College in 1971 (with majors in physics and philosophy) and a J.D. degree from Yale Law School in 1975.

From 1975 until 1976, Levy worked as a law clerk for United States District Judge Gerhard Gesell.

== Professional career ==
From 1976 until 1981, Levy worked as an associate at Covington & Burling, and then served as an assistant to the Solicitor General of the United States from 1981 until 1986. He then became a partner at the law firm of Mayer Brown in Chicago, focusing on Supreme Court and appellate litigation.

In 1993, Levy was tapped to join the administration of President Bill Clinton, who had been one class ahead of Levy at Yale Law School. Levy became deputy assistant attorney general in the United States Department of Justice's Civil Division, overseeing litigation pending in the federal appeals courts. During his time as a deputy assistant attorney general, Levy largely handled managerial duties, although he did argue some cases. "I argued the gays in the military litigation, the Brady Act challenges, and some suits filed in connection with the Freedom of Access to Clinic Entrances Law," he told Corporate Legal Times in 1995. "That was institutional litigation at its most interesting. It was like three-dimensional chess with all the interplay that went on between policy, politics and law."

In September 1995, Levy left the Clinton administration to join the Washington, D.C., law firm of Howrey & Simon (now Howrey LLP) as a partner in the firm's Washington appellate practice group.

Between 2003 and 2005, Levy joined the Washington offices of the law firm of Kilpatrick Stockton as counsel, chairing the firm's Supreme Court and Appellate Advocacy practice. Though a Democrat, Levy was a close friend and a Yale Law School classmate of Supreme Court Associate Justice Samuel Alito, and Levy spoke out in support of s confirmation hearings.

On January 26, 2009, Levy won a case before the United States Supreme Court, which was the 16th and final case he had argued before the high court. The Supreme Court ruled unanimously in favor of Levy's client, DuPont, in an Employee Retirement Income Security Act case Kennedy v. DuPont Plan Administrator. Levy had argued the case before the court on October 7, 2008.

== Death ==
On April 30, 2009, Levy, a resident of Bethesda, Maryland, died of a gunshot wound at the Washington offices of Kilpatrick & Stockton. Unnamed sources have leaked the claim that the gunshot was self-inflicted, though no autopsy has been completed. Reportedly, Levy had been told that he was in the process of being laid off. However, Mark Levy was a very successful lawyer, arguing 16 cases in front of the Supreme Court and even headed much of the raising of money for the failed Hillary Clinton campaign for president. According to friends of Levy, they were "shocked" and his death was "unexpected". A friend of his described their last conversation as one where he was looking to the future and even the planning of a trip to Italy, which one would think would not be in the plans of someone planning suicide and would suggest that money was not a problem.

A close friend, who asked not to be named, says Levy called her Wednesday afternoon after he was laid off, and the two chatted about his future for 30 minutes. Levy, the friend says, did not have a job lined up. "I was telling him his departure was an opportunity to find something he was excited about," she says. "He seemed like he was concerned about what he was going to do." Still, she says he was looking forward to an upcoming trip to Italy to celebrate his 60th birthday with his family.

Levy was involved in a court battle involving Vince Foster whose death, coincidentally, also was ruled a suicide. However, some persons believed that Foster's death was not a suicide. Kenneth Starr, the special prosecutor who investigated Bill Clinton, argued in the Supreme Court that he was entitled to have access to the notes made by James Hamilton, Foster's personal lawyer, during an interview that occurred nine days before Foster's death. Levy filed a friend-of-the-court brief, arguing that Hamilton's notes of his discussions with Foster were protected by the attorney-client privilege even after Foster's death. The Supreme Court ruled that the privilege continued even after Foster's death, and denied Starr access to the notes.
