= Timothy J. Holst =

Timothy J. Holst (October 9, 1947 – April 16, 2009) began his circus career in 1971 graduating from Clown College, touring as a clown in 1972, and then became the singing ringmaster in 1973 with Ringling Bros. and Barnum & Bailey Circus.

The son of a postman and a nurse, Holst was born in Galesburg, Illinois. A lifelong Mormon, he served as a missionary for two years in Sweden. He attended Ricks College and Utah State University, studying drama. While performing in the summer stock theater in Yellowstone National Park, he was "discovered" by a traveling promoter for Ringling Brothers.

He later became the General Manager of the Red Show and ultimately the Feld Entertainment Inc. Vice President of Talent and Production in 1984. He spent the last twenty years of his career identifying and signing new hires for the circus, and was responsible for making deals with then-Communist countries to hire performers and enter into cultural exchanges. As the talent scout for Ringling Brothers and Barnum & Bailey Circus, he traveled to 164 countries, where he recruited more than 3,000 people before his death in 2009.

When not traveling 11 months of the year, Holst lived most of his adult life in Sarasota County, Florida. He died in Sao Paulo, Brazil while on a trip there to recruit circus performers. On January 16, 2013, Adrienne, Matthew and Megan Holst accepted the Ring of Fame award on behalf of their late father, Tim Holst. The official Circus Ring of Fame memorial tribute to Tim Holst from the Feld Family and Ringling Brothers Barnum & Bailey Circus can be seen on the Circle in Sarasota Florida on St. Armands Key.

Holst appeared in a segment of Sesame Street with nine other clowns. He is number 8 and he bonks himself on the head with a mallet.
