= Ossie Lambert =

Australian cricketer

Personal information
- Full name: Oswald Lambert
- Born: 23 August 1926; New Lambton, New South Wales, Australia
- Died: 13 April 2009 (aged 82); Doncaster, Melbourne, Australia
- Source: ESPNcricinfo, 4 January 2017

Ossie Lambert (23 August 1926 – 13 April 2009) was an Australian cricketer. He played twenty-four first-class matches for New South Wales between 1950/51 and 1956/57.

== See also ==
- List of New South Wales representative cricketers
