= Michel Mondésert =

Catholic bishop (1916–2009)

- Auxiliary Bishop of Diocese of Grenoble-Vienne Emeritus
- Church: Roman Catholic Church
- See: Diocese of Grenoble-Vienne
- In office: 1971 - 1992

Orders
- Ordination: 11 July 1943

Personal details
- Born: December 5, 1916; Villefranche-sur-Saône, France
- Died: 16 April 2009

Michel Mondésert (5 December 1916 – 16 April 2009) was a French prelate of the Roman Catholic Church.

Mondésert was born in Villefranche-sur-Saône, Rhône, and was ordained a priest on 11 July 1943. Appointed Auxiliary Bishop to the Diocese of Grenoble-Vienne on 4 June 1971 and ordained bishop on 25 September 1971. He would remain bishop of Grenoble-Vienne until his retirement on 11 January 1992.

Mondésert was the Titular bishop of Apollonis from 1971 until his death.
