= Perez Zagorin =

American historian (1920–2009)

- Born: May 20, 1920; Chicago, Illinois, U.S.
- Died: April 26, 2009 (aged 88)
- Education: University of Chicago (BA); Harvard University (MA, PhD)
- Occupation: Historian
- Spouse: Honoré Desmond Sharrer (m. 1947; died 2009)
- Children: 1
- Parent(s): Solomon Novitz Zagorin; Mildred Ginsburg Zagorin

Perez Zagorin (May 20, 1920 – April 26, 2009) was an American historian who specialized in 16th- and 17th-century English and British history and political thought, early modern European history, and related areas in literature and philosophy. From 1965 to 1990, he taught at the University of Rochester, New York, retiring as the Joseph C. Wilson Professor of History Emeritus.

== Life and career ==
Zagorin was born in Chicago, Illinois, on May 29, 1920, to Solomon Novitz and Mildred Ginsburg Zagorin. He married the artist Honoré Desmond Sharrer on May 29, 1947. They had one son, Adam Zagorin, who currently works for Time Magazine and has two sons of his own.

Zagorin's B.A. was from the University of Chicago; he earned both his M.A. and Ph.D. from Harvard University in 1947 and 1952 respectively. At Harvard, Zagorin was a student of Wilbur Kitchener Jordan, Charles McIlwain and others. His dissertation examined the views of political radicals during the English Revolution of the seventeenth century.

A US House Subcommittee report in 1949 investigating the influence of the Communist Party within the US labor movement named Zagorin as a person of interest. The report noted that there was “overwhelming evidence” that Zagorin was a member of the US Communist Party, citing his contributions to the Communist Party Daily Worker magazine as well as his efforts to established an honorarium event for International Communist Party President Georgi Dimitrov.

The HCUA inquiry into the influence of communists within the US State Department in 1952 threw into question Zagorin's Marxist orientation as a former State Department employee during the Second World War. His strident advocacy of Marxism could not be easily reconciled with the security requirements of Smith Act of 1936 and the oath requirements of Hatch Act of 1942, both of which vetted against membership in the communist party. Given this prohibition it is unlikely that Zagorin disclosed his Marxist loyalties and association with communism in the course of his employment to the State Department. He would return to his inconsistencies under oath in his later years, examining the issue of dissimulation under oath in a study entitled, Ways of Lying.

He taught history at Amherst College (1947–1949), at Vassar College (1951–1953), and reached the rank of full Professor at McGill University, Montreal, while teaching there (1955–1965). The move to Canada resulted in part because of difficulties he encountered finding a tenure-track position in the U.S.A. because of his political beliefs, as McCarthyism threatened academic freedom.

He then returned to the U.S., teaching briefly at Johns Hopkins University, before joining the faculty at the University of Rochester, New York, in 1965, subsequently chairing the History Department (1967–1969). He then held the Joseph P. Wilson Professorship of History (1982) until his retirement in 1990. From 1992 until his death, Zagorin was a research Fellow of the Edgar F. Shannon Center for Advanced Studies at the University of Virginia, Charlottesville.

He held fellowships at several other distinguished institutions, including the Folger Shakespeare Library, Guggenheim Fellowship, the American Academy of Arts and Sciences, the National Endowment for the Humanities, the Institute for Advanced Study in Princeton, and the Royal Historical Society of Great Britain.

== Early work ==
His revised dissertation became his first major publication, A History of Political Thought in the English Revolution. His second monograph, The Court and the Country: the Beginning of the English Revolution (1969), explored the origins of the English Revolution by examining the split in the English governing class.

He then moved to consider the nature of early modern revolution itself, publishing a European-wide comparative survey of his results in two volumes, Rebels and Rulers 1500-1600 (1982), a study of early modern European revolutions in particular, and especially differentiating them from the modern exemplar, the French Revolution. His next work Ways of Lying (1990) was in effect a counterpart study that looked at the effects on individuals as early modern states demanded various forms of loyalty oaths, often in pursuit of religious uniformity, and the emergence of counter-theories about the practice and acceptability of resisting such demands—the roots of the American notion of the right against self-incrimination.

== Later work ==
Zagorin then produced a series of monographs on particular participants in the troubles of 17th-century England, first Milton: Aristocrat & Rebel (1992), looking at the political beliefs of the poet John Milton. Next was Francis Bacon (1999), about the English philosopher and courtier, Sir Francis Bacon, that explored the dissonance between the soaring ideals of Bacon's philosophical ambitions and his life as courtier, politician, and lawyer serving in government. A final monograph on Thomas Hobbes, Hobbes and the Law of Nature, was published posthumously in 2009.

Zagorin's last survey work, How the Idea of Religious Toleration Came to the West (2003), returned to questions regarding individual belief ranged against those who claimed the right to enforce religious conformity by force if necessary, tracing the emergence of a particular and contested view of a right to freedom of conscience. It arose out of the religious conflicts of the 17th century, and informed the views of the American founders. There is a transcript of a radio interview by the Australian Broadcasting Corporation (ABC) from shortly after the book's publication that provides some background on this book. ABC Interview

In 2005 Zagorin published Thucydides: An Introduction for the Common Reader (2005), a non-specialist work on Thucydides's History of the Peloponnesian War. Zagorin argues the work is more than a mere chronicle of the conflict between Athens and Sparta, being also a story of politics, decision-making, the uses of power, and the human and communal experience of war. In his view the work remains of permanent interest because of the exceptional intellect that Thucydides brought to the writing of history, and to the originality and intensity of vision that inform his narrative.

== Books ==
- A History of Political Thought in the English Revolution (1954).
- The Court and the Country: the Beginning of the English Revolution (1969).
- Culture and politics from Puritanism to the Enlightenment (1980), editor, essays.
- Rebels and Rulers 1500-1600: v.1 Society, States, and Early Modern Revolution: Agrarian and Urban Rebellions (1982).
- Rebels and Rulers 1500-1600: v.2 Provincial rebellion: Revolutionary Civil Wars, 1560-1660 (1982).
- Ways of lying : dissimulation, persecution, and conformity in early modern Europe (1990).
- Milton, aristocrat & rebel : the poet and his politics (1992).
- Philosophy, Science, and Religion in England 1640-1700 (1992), co-editor, essays.
- The English Revolution: politics, events, ideas (1998). Collected essays.
- Francis Bacon (1998).
- How the Idea of Religious Toleration Came to the West (2003).
- Thucydides: An Introduction for the Common Reader (2005).
- Hobbes and the Law of Nature (2009)
- [Honorificus] Court, country, and culture : essays on early modern British history in honor of Perez Zagorin (1992)
