= Robin Guthrie (charity administrator) =

Charity administrator and public servant

- Born: 27 June 1937; Cambridge, England
- Died: 12 April 2009 (aged 71); York, England
- Occupations: Teacher; Public servant Trustee
- Known for: Former director of the Joseph Rowntree Foundation; Director of Social and Economic Affairs at the Council of Europe

Robin Isles Loftus Guthrie (27 June 1937 – 12 April 2009) was a British teacher, public servant and chairman of several charities.

== Biography ==
=== Early life ===
Guthrie was born in Cambridge and attended Clifton College. He gained a certificate in education from Liverpool University and a MSc in economics from the London School of Economics.

=== Career ===
Guthrie became head of Cambridge House in 1962. In 1969 he became the social development officer for the New Town in Peterborough. In 1975–1979 he was the assistant director of the social work service at the Department of Health and Social Security and in 1979 became director of the Joseph Rowntree Memorial Trust. In 1988 he returned to London as the Chief Charity Commissioner in a bid to update the department. His work in the department helped lead to the Charities Act (1993). In 1992 he was appointed director of Social and Economic Affairs at the Council of Europe. He was a Trustee of the Thalidomide Trust UK, a founding chairman of the York Early Music Foundation and the founding chairman of York Museums Trust when it was formed in 2002, a governor of York St John University and chairman of York-based charity Jessie’s Fund.

=== Death ===
Gurthrie died suddenly in hospital. His funeral was held at York Minster on 1 May 2009.
