= Manfred Jessen-Klingenberg =

German historian

- Born: 13 November 1933; Norderstapel
- Died: 1 April 2009 (aged 75); Oldenburg in Holstein, Germany
- Education: University of Kiel
- Occupation: Historian

Manfred Jessen-Klingenberg (November 13, 1933 – April 1, 2009) was a German historian. He is regarded as "one of Schleswig-Holstein's most distinguished regional historians".

Jessen-Klingenberg studied history and Latin philology at the University of Kiel. After obtaining his doctorate in 1962, he became Wissenschaftlicher Assistent at the Chair of Schleswig-Holstein and Nordic History. Then from 1975 on, he worked as a teacher and university lecturer at the Kiel University of Education and University of Kiel. The latter appointed him honorary professor in 2000. From 1998 until his death he chaired the Board of Trustees of the Institute for Schleswig-Holstein Contemporary and Regional History at the University of Flensburg. In this and other scientific committees and associations he was active "as an author of reports on the development of the regional historical landscape and advisor of historical or museum projects, as a mediating historian in communication in the German-Danish border region, as editor and co-editor of various regional historical journals and yearbooks."

His research was focused on the history of Schleswig-Holstein, especially on historic canal projects from the Eider Canal to the Kiel Canal, the constitutional and national movement of the country in the 19th century, the history of German-Danish relations since the time of Enlightened Absolutism, including minority and borderland issues, as well as the period of the Weimar Republic and Nazi Germany in particular with regard to the history of the University of Kiel.

Jessen-Klingenberg is best known for his research on the proclamation of the Republic by Philipp Scheidemann on 9 November 1918. With his essay published in 1968, he has provided the narrative about this event that is still predominant in historical scholarship today.

== Selected bibliography ==
- Eiderstedt 1713–1864. Landschaft und Landesherrschaft in königlich-absolutistischer Zeit. Wachholtz, Neumünster: 1967 (Quellen und Forschungen zur Geschichte Schleswig-Holsteins, Volume 53) OCLC 12815716
- "Die Ausrufung der Republik durch Philipp Scheidemann am 9. November 1918" pages 649–656 from Geschichte in Wissenschaft und Unterricht, Volume 19, 1968 ISSN 0016-9056
- Standpunkte zur neueren Geschichte Schleswig-Holsteins edited by Reimer Hansen and Jörn-Peter Leppien, Schleswig-Holsteinischer Geschichtsverlag, Malente : 1998 ISBN 978-3-933-86225-9
