= John Blankenchip =

American director and theatre designer

- Born: November 14, 1919
- Died: April 1, 2009 (aged 89)
- Occupation(s): theater designer, director, professor
- Known for: taught for 50 years at USC

John Blankenchip (November 14, 1919 – April 1, 2009) was a director, theater designer, and professor at the School of Theatre at the University of Southern California.
