= Ocean Pacific =

American sportsware company

Ocean Pacific Apparel Corp.
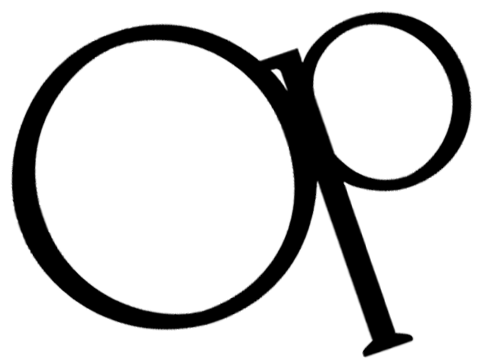
- Company type: Subsidiary
- Industry: Clothing
- Founded: 1972; 54 years ago
- Founder: Jim Jenks
- Headquarters: Irvine, California, U.S.
- Products: T-shirts, sweatshirts, hoodies, shoes.
- Parent: Iconix Brand Group
- Website: oceanpacific.com

Ocean Pacific Apparel Corp. (Ocean Pacific or OP) is a clothing company based in Irvine, California, United States. It produces T-shirts, sweatshirts, hoodies, shoes and beverage mugs.

== History ==
The first "Ocean Pacific" trademark brand was started by John Smith in the 1960s as a surfboard brand, which he sold out of his shop, North County Ding Repair. Later, Fred Ryan purchased North County Ding Repair from John Smith along with the Ocean Pacific surfboard label. The Ocean Pacific label was later sold to Don Hansen of Hansen Surf Shop.

In 1972, Jim Jenks of San Diego wanted to create clothing and sportswear that met the demands of surfers in and out of the surf. He received the name from his then employer, Don Hansen, and the Ocean Pacific apparel line was created. Jenks' idea for clothing under the Ocean Pacific label quickly became popular with the surf culture with its instantly recognizable "OP" logo.

OP's designs showed the visual aesthetic of each era through the years, from the primary color stripes of the 1970s to the bright neon and geometric shapes of the 1980s. Regarding the marketing strategies, unlike other surfing firms like Quiksilver or Billabong, OP established as a more general sportswear brand, commercializing its products in national store chains while other similar companies were restricted to independent surf shops. Moreover, OP also designed clothing for both adults and young people.

The Ocean Pacific brand experienced financial trouble through the 1990s. Richard Baker's investment group Doyle & Boissiere bought Ocean Pacific in 1998. Baker stayed on as Warnaco acquired Ocean Pacific in 2003 and sold it to current owner Iconix Brand Group in 2006.

== Ad campaigns ==
In the summer of 2008, an ad campaign to celebrate their 35-year anniversary was launched, featuring celebrities such as actress Rumer Willis, reality show star Kristin Cavallari, singer Christina Milian, musician and fashion designer Pete Wentz of Fall Out Boy and Clandestine Industries, actor Wilmer Valderrama, actress and supermodel Josie Maran, and actor and singer Corbin Bleu.

The Summer 2009 campaign ads featured Sophia Bush, Solange Knowles, and AnnaLynne McCord. Joining those in the Fall 2009 ads were actor Cody Linley, reality star Brody Jenner, and musician Joel Madden. OP also presented tours in 2009 which featured Boys Like Girls, The Maine, and Cobra Starship.

The 2010 spring team was announced with a special puzzle on OP's website. The puzzle featured a hidden picture of the team and everyday a few more pieces were revealed until the entire team was revealed. Members of Team OP for Spring 2010 were actor Cory Monteith, actress Jessica Szohr, actor and model Trevor Donovan, actress and singer Dianna Agron, singer Cassie, and actor Alex Meraz. The theme for Spring/Summer 2010 was "Rock Your Shine".

Members of Team OP for Spring/Summer 2011 are Mark Salling, Chord Overstreet, Aly Michalka, Brenda Song, Katerina Graham, and Rob Kardashian.

Iconix Brand Group signed an exclusive direct-to-retail license agreement with Walmart in August 2007. As of 2018, Iconix Brand Group has taken back control of the brand's distribution and will be re-launching Spring 2019.

== See also ==
- Surf culture
- Unsalted: A Great Lakes Experience, a documentary film featuring members of the 1995 Ocean Pacific surf team
