= Herbert Scheinberg =

American physician (1919–2009)

Israel Herbert Scheinberg (August 16, 1919 – April 4, 2009) was an American physician who specialized in Wilson's disease and other rare hereditary diseases.

Scheinberg was born in Manhattan and attended DeWitt Clinton High School in the Bronx, New York City; he won a place at Harvard University, graduating with a bachelor's degree in chemistry in 1940. He then attended Harvard Medical School, graduating in 1943. He undertook his medical internship at Boston's Peter Bent Brigham Hospital, followed by time in the Army Medical Corps.

Scheinberg then began his academic career back at Harvard and joined the Albert Einstein College of Medicine upon its foundation in 1955.

Scheinberg and David Gitlin developed an inexpensive blood test to measure levels of ceruloplasmin in the blood, making the diagnosis of Wilson's disease easier. A version of the test is still in use today.

While Scheinberg was a faculty member at Albert Einstein College of Medicine, he, Irmin Sternlieb and John Walshe of Cambridge University researched the use of penicillamine as a treatment for Wilson's Disease.

Scheinberg's first wife, Tess Levine, died of a brain tumor shortly after giving birth to their daughter Anne. In 1957, Scheinberg married Denise Mangravite. The two had a son (David) and daughter (Cynthia).

Scheinberg enjoyed astronomy and traveled great distances to witness all major eclipses of the sun.
