= Gonzalo Olave =

Chilean actor

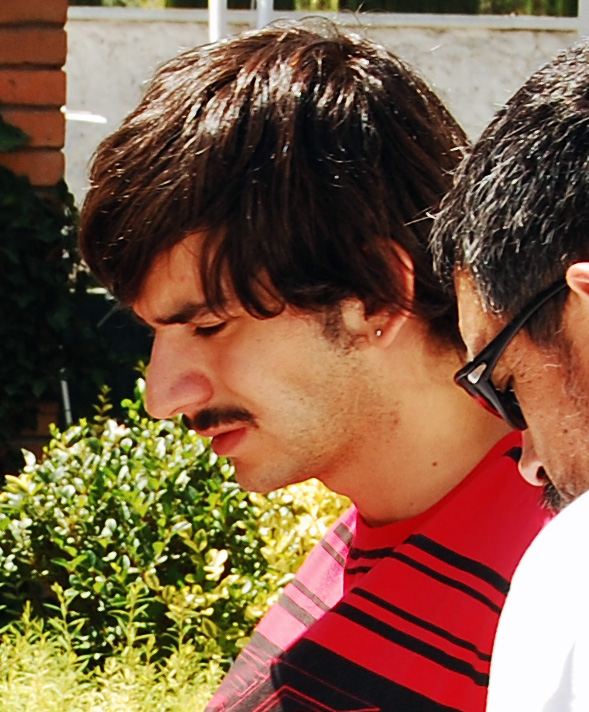
- Gonzalo Olave in 2007
- Born: Gonzalo Alonso Olave Alcaide; December 29, 1983; Santiago
- Died: April 4, 2009 (aged 25); Santiago
- Occupation: Actor

Gonzalo Olave Alcaide (Santiago, December 29, 1983 - Santiago, April 4, 2009) was a Chilean actor, best known by his role in the telenovela called Lola and his recent work in Mis Años Grossos where he obtained the main role.

== Biography ==
Gonzalo Alonso Olave Alcaide was born in Santiago, Chile. He studied at the Liceo Manuel Barros Borgoño and later attended Instituto Profesional DuocUC. From the age of 16, Olave modelled for Chilean and international television advertisements, and was the second male to appear nude in a Chilean advertisement.

In 2007, he debuted as an actor in the role of Sebastián "Boogie" Cuevas in the telenovela Lola by Canal 13. At the same time, Olave acted in theatre with his company "La Marcha". After Lola ended, in March 2009, Olave appeared as the lead in the TV series Mis Años Grossos, as the Chilean version of Eric Forman from That '70s Show.

On April 4, 2009, Olave was involved in a motorcycle accident on San Ignacio Street, Santiago. A car hit him, causing serious injuries. He was taken to Hospital Barros Luco where he later died. On 7 April 2009, Gonzalo Olave was buried in the Cementerio General de Santiago.

== Filmography ==
- Lola - Sebastián "Boogie" Cuevas (Canal 13, 2007–2008)
- Mi Primera Vez - (TVN, 2009)
- Mis Años Grossos - Rodrigo Molina (Chilevisión, 2009)
