= Honoré Desmond Sharrer =

American painter (1920–2009)

- Honoré Sharrer, photograph by W. Eugene Smith
- Born: July 12, 1920; West Point, New York, U.S.
- Died: April 17, 2009 (aged 88)
- Education: Yale University; San Francisco Art Institute
- Known for: Painting

Honoré Desmond Sharrer (July 12, 1920 – April 17, 2009) was an American artist. She first received public acclaim in 1950 for her painting Tribute to the American Working People, a five-image polyptych conceived in the form of a Renaissance altarpiece, except that its central figure is a factory worker and not a saint. Flanking this central figure are smaller scenes of ordinary people—at a picnic, in a parlor, on a farm and in the schoolroom. Meticulously painted in oil on composition board in a style and color palette reminiscent of the Flemish Masters, the finished work is more than six feet long and three feet high and took her five years to complete. It was the subject of a 2007 retrospective at the Smithsonian Institution and is part of the permanent collection of the Smithsonian American Art Museum.

She first received public notice when her work Workers and Paintings (1943) was included in the legendary 1946 "Fourteen Americans" show at the Museum of Modern Art in New York, curated by Dorothy Canning Miller. This show featured a selection of up and coming artists including Robert Motherwell, Isamu Noguchi (sculpture), and Saul Steinberg. The "Fourteen Americans" show at the Museum of Modern Art, while often thought to proclaim the arrival of abstract expressionism did not do so unambiguously since it included those like Sharrer and George Tooker who are not modernists based on the litmus test of abstraction.

Sharrer and her painting Man at Fountain were featured in the March 20, 1950 issue of Life Magazine, in a cover story featuring "Nineteen Young American Artists."

Unlike many of her New York contemporaries including Motherwell, Jackson Pollock and Mark Rothko, Sharrer did not take the turn to abstract expressionism and continued to paint in a figurative and academic style, although the content of her work was often mordantly witty. The term Magic Realism applied to other American painters including Paul Cadmus and George Tooker is often used to describe her later work.

== Life and education ==
Honoré Desmond Sharrer was born at West Point, N.Y. Her father, Robert Allen Sharrer, was an Army officer attached to the United States Military Academy there. Her mother, the former Madeleine Sachs, was also a painter. Sharrer was reared in the Philippines, Paris and in several American cities before graduating from The Bishop's School in La Jolla, California.

At 18, she was chosen out 230,000 applicants to win a national graphic arts Youth Forum prize sponsored by The American Magazine. Subsequently, she attended Yale University School of Art and the California School of Fine Arts, now the San Francisco Art Institute. During World War II, she worked as a welder in shipyards in California and New Jersey.

After an earlier marriage that ended in divorce, in 1947 Sharrer married Perez Zagorin, a prominent historian of Europe. They lived and worked in New York, Amherst, Montreal, London, Rochester, NY and Charlottesville, VA. They had one son, Adam Zagorin, born 1953.

== Art ==
After a solo exhibition of her paintings in Boston in 1951, Sharrer did not have another solo show until 1969. After another eighteen years she had a 1987 solo exhibition that traveled from New York City to the Memorial Art Gallery (Rochester, NY) and the Danforth Museum (Framingham, MA).

While often included in group shows in those intervening periods, and although she worked continuously and diligently on her art, she was often overlooked as "modern art" came to be seen as synonymous with abstract expressionism. So powerful was this association that MoMA had to name its show in 2000 (in which Sharrer was included) as "Modern Art despite Modernism," as if the latter were synonymous with the former.

Despite her meticulous technique, luminous color palette, and eye for telling detail reminiscent of Flemish painters, she was a modernist in sensibility and subject. A painting like Resurrection of a Waitress (1984), displays a sly humor in its choice of subject matter that hearkens back to her Tribute, but also shares with the latter a modernist's assumption that the life of a waitress or working man is as deserving of our attention as any saint. The waitress is carried heavenwards—held aloft means of an eggbeater caught in her hair—by a partially nude angel, whose method of propulsion is a whirlygig rather than wings.

One of her largest paintings (9 x 6 feet) is a surreal oil on canvas, entitled Leda and the Folks, from 1963. It is one of Sharrer's earlier forays into surrealism, featuring three somewhat oddly proportioned figures, two of which are based on Elvis Presley's parents, while the third, a Renaissance-like, golden-haired nude young woman, represents Sharrer's take on the ancient Greek myth of Leda and the Swan, in which Zeus transformed himself into a swan in order to seduce a beautiful woman. The painting is displayed at the Smith College Museum of Art in Northampton, Massachusetts, as part of the exhibition A Dangerous Woman: Subversion & Surrealism in the Art of Honoré Sharrer (September 29, 2017 – January 7, 2018). As their curator explains, the painting came in part from Sharrer's interest in examining the intersection of myth and the celebrity culture that surrounded Presley and other popular entertainment figures in the early 1960s.

Equally enigmatic is another of her late paintings, A Dream of Monticello (1996) in which a female nude wearing headphones reclines with one red pump on and one off. Thomas Jefferson, and presumably one of his sons with Sally Hemings are standing just behind. In the background are two triumphal obelisks flanking an almost Dali-esque clock, presumably the clock at Monticello. In the foreground is a beautifully rendered silver ewer, a known Monticello objét.

== Awards ==
- 1951: Norman Waite Harris Medal and Prize, Art Institute of Chicago
- 1971: Childe Hassam Purchase Prize, American Academy and Institute of Arts and Letters, NY
- 1978: Childe Hassam Purchase Prize, American Academy and Institute of Arts and Letters, NY
- 1981: Lillian Fairchild Award for Outstanding Achievement in the Arts, University of Rochester, NY
- 1984: Gladys Emerson Cook Prize, National Academy of Design, NY
- 1987: Award for Outstanding Achievement in Visual Arts, National Women's Caucus for Art
- 2000: Prize for Outstanding Accomplishment in Painting, American Academy and Institute of Arts and Letters, NY

== Collections ==
- Columbus Museum of Art, OH
- Danforth Museum, Framingham, MA
- Estate of Lincoln Kirstein
- Memorial Art Gallery, Rochester, NY
- Metropolitan Museum of Art, NY
- Museum of Modern Art, NY
- Newark Museum, NJ
- San Diego Museum of Art, CA
- Sarah Roby Foundation
- Smithsonian American Art Museum, Washington, DC
- Smith College Museum of Art, Northampton, MA
- University of Rochester, NY
- Pennsylvania Academy of the Fine Arts
- University of Virginia Art Museum
