= Franciszek Sobczak =

Polish fencer

Personal information
- Born: 4 October 1939 Katowice, Poland
- Died: 24 April 2009 (aged 69)

Sport
- Sport: Fencing

Franciszek Sobczak (4 October 1939 – 24 April 2009) was a Polish fencer. He competed in the team sabre event at the 1968 Summer Olympics.
