= Marsel Markulin =

Croatian gymnast (1936–2009)

- Born: 29 October 1936 Zagreb, Yugoslavia
- Died: 1 April 2009 (aged 72) Zagreb, Croatia

Gymnastics career
- Discipline: Men's artistic gymnastics
- Country represented: (Socialist Federal Republic of Yugoslavia) Yugoslavia

Marsel Markulin (29 October 1936 – 1 April 2009) was a Croatian gymnast. He competed in eight events at the 1960 Summer Olympics.
