= Tengiz Gudava =

Soviet dissident (1953–2009)

- Born: 28 November 1953; Samtredia
- Died: 16 April 2009 (aged 55); Prague
- Occupation: Journalist

Tengiz Gudava (Georgian: თენგიზ გუდავა, Russian: Тенгиз Зурабович Гудава; 28 November 1953 – 16 April 2009) was a Georgian author and human rights activist who was expelled from the Soviet Union in 1987 and worked for Radio Free Europe/Radio Liberty for 17 years. He died in Prague in 2009 under ill-defined circumstances.

== Background ==
Born in Samtredia, Soviet Georgia to a Georgian father and a Russian mother, Gudava graduated from the 2nd Moscow Medical Institute with a degree in biophysics. Tengiz Gudava, and his brother Eduard, engaged in dissident movement. They formed a rock band "Phantom" which organized unsanctioned concerts to attract the public attention to human rights issues, published in samizdat, and participated in the Georgian Helsinki Group, formed by young Georgian dissidents in the 1970s to monitor the Helsinki Accords.

In 1982, Tengiz Gudava was arrested by the Soviet authorities; he was held in investigative detention for 1 year, then sentenced to 7 years imprisonment and 3 years in exile for "anti-Soviet activities". His brother Eduard publicly protested his arrest in November 1985, and was himself sentenced to up to 4 years imprisonment. Having served 5 years in a labor camp, the Gudava brothers were released in 1987 on condition of that they would leave the Soviet Union. Tengiz Gudava went to the United States where he would eventually become a naturalized United States citizen.

In 1987, he moved to Europe, and worked for what were then the Georgian and Russian services of the RFE/RL in Munich, and later (since 1995), in Prague. Earlier in his career, Gudava was a close associate of Zviad Gamsakhurdia, a fellow Georgian dissident and the future first democratically elected President of Georgia. However Gudava eventually broke with Gamsakhurdia over the latter's nationalist rhetoric.

In Europe he collaborated with the Soviet dissidents such as Vladimir Bukovsky and Yuri Yarim-Agaev in their émigré NGOs and regularly published on political, economic, and cultural problems in the Soviet Union and then CIS counties, especially Central Asia and Caucasia.

In 2004, together with Serge Iourienen and Mario Corti, left RFE/RL in protest to what they believed was an increasingly conformist line of the Russian service. He then worked as an independent journalist.

== Writings ==
Tengiz Gudava was the author of a number of articles and essays on Georgian and Soviet dissident movement, politics and human right problems in the former Soviet countries, several poems and two novels (Ego zvali Anzhelika, 2003; Gelgoland, 2008; both in Russian).

== Death ==
On April 20, 2009, the RFE/RL reported on Gudava's death under "unclear circumstances" in Prague. According to the report, on the night of April 15, Gudava left his Prague apartment on foot to buy cigarettes, but never returned. He was found unconscious on a road way a 20-minute drive from his home in a secluded area. A motorist found him unconscious and called emergency services, but Gudava died en route to the hospital, having never regained consciousness. His body was discovered, without his wallet, in a morgue by the police some distance from his home. Police identified his death as a result of a car accident, but offered no further details.
