= Germán Martínez Hidalgo =

Mexican academic (1929–2009)

Germán Martinez Hidalgo (December 23, 1929 – April 25, 2009 Puebla, Mexico) was a scientist, physicist, mathematician, chemist, and astronomer who popularized science by writing weekly articles in the Mexican newspaper, El Sol de Puebla. Martinez was also a professor, college principal, planetary director, humanist, philosopher and historian.

He was a prolific writer who wrote more than 1000 science-related weekly articles in both Spanish and English. His work appears posthumously in his regular two-page science section due to the enormous amount of work he left behind. Hundreds of his articles can be found online at the web page of El Sol de Puebla.

== Family origins ==
He was the son of Sephardic jews (descendant from the Jews from Spain and Portugal) Germano Martin (Martenazen/Martinez) and Carmela Hidalgo y Costilla Savalas. By his mother family side he is a Sephardi Jew with origins in Southern Spanish town Jaén Andalucía, and the Netherlands, the family is related to Claes Martenazen V.R. a sephardi Jew from Spain who fled Holland during Spanish Inquisition and later the Martenazen family settled in New Amsterdam, today New York City, changing the name to Martens, and the English and Spanish versions as Martin and Martinez according to hide from the Inquisition, He's also cousin of Mexican actress Silvia Pinal Hidalgo the Hidalgo family shortened the last name from Hidalgo y Costilla, Mr. Martinez Hidalgo is descendant of Manuel Mariano Hidalgo y Costilla, younger brother of Miguel Hidalgo y Costilla, Manuel Mariano Hidalgo was a lawyer defending Sephardic jews against the Spanish Inquisition, later the Inquisition found and determined the Hidalgo y Costilla family was in fact a Jewish family from Spain, the Hidalgos were accused as "judaizantes" (Jews respecting the law of Moses but hiding under Spanish names and identities.)

== Professional career ==
Mr. Hidalgo was the director of the Escuela Normal Superior del Estado de Puebla. He was the founder and president of the Sociedad Astronomica de Puebla A.C., now called Sociedad Astronomica de Puebla GERMAN MARTINEZ HIDALGO A.C. He was the founder and first director of the Planetario de Puebla, now called Planetario Maestro en Ciencias GERMAN MARTINEZ HIDALGO. in which this Planetarium was one of the best in America due to the high humanist and scientific profile Hidalgo had, Organized several scientific events cherished by European Embassies and other Scientific Institutions around the World, as well as was congratulated by several scientifics like Aghii Bohr, son of Niels Bohr Created several free-attendance events dedicated to the greatest minds in History since ancient Greece to modern times, with conferences once per week at the Planetarium free of charge, introducing this vital knowledge to every one who may be interested, As a writer he published in 1992 a theory of the two-system concept referring to Charon and Pluto, for that studies was invited to join as a full member of the prestigious New York Science Academy, was invited to the International Aerospace Congress held in Moscow Russia 2001, in 2005 traveled to Europe in where he was received with honors at the Planetariums of Paris and Moscow.

In January 2012, a monument dedicated to German M. Hidalgo and to the cosmos exploration was inaugurated by authorities of the City of Puebla, Friends and Family, having his cousin Actress Silvia Pinal Hildalgo as the Honor Guest of the ceremony, Mexican Diva Silvia Pinal Hidalgo gave a speech remembering Mr. German M. Hidalgo. The monument is represented by a smoke line inspired in the smoke line left during a space rocket launch and on the top of it a steel Saturn, the Monument height is 9 meters up.

The English philosopher and write Allan Woods expressed his condolences to his family and friends, "...with a deep sense of sadness and pain, I knew my good friend and comrade, German M. Hidalgo an outstanding scientific has gone...I had the privilege to meet him, and become his friend...He (GMH) was the best type of intellectual, a wise man, and erudite with a vast knowledge on culture, sciences and philosophy and at the same time humble, his loss, is a loss for the entire world..."
