= Reyahn King =

British curator and museum director

- Occupations: Museum curator Director

Academic background
- Education: Boston University

Academic work
- Institutions: National Portrait Gallery; Birmingham Museum and Art Gallery; Herbert Art Gallery and Museum; National Museums Liverpool; Heritage Lottery Fund; York Museums Trust

Reyahn King is a British curator and museum director. She is Director of Heritage Properties for National Trust for Scotland.

== Early life and education ==
King grew up in Surrey. From the age of 11, when her family went to Tanzania, she divided her time between there and boarding school in the UK. She studied for an undergraduate degree in modern history at Oxford University and, briefly worked at the National Portrait Gallery in London, before attending Boston University to study for a master's degree.

== Career ==
King worked as curator of prints and drawings at Birmingham Museum and Art Gallery before moving to the Herbert Art Gallery and Museum in Coventry. She returned to Birmingham Museums as a manager before, in 2007, joining National Museums Liverpool as director of art galleries. From 2012 to 2015 King worked for the Heritage Lottery Fund as the head of the West Midlands region. She chaired the Jury for the John Moores Painting Prize in 2008 and 2010, and was a judge for Liverpool Art Prize in 2008.

King was appointed as chief executive of York Museums Trust in November 2015. She was only the second CEO of the Trust, following Janet Barnes who had held the role from its inception in 2002. As chief executive of York Museums Trust in 2017, King led the bid to secure £4.9 million funding of Arts Council England. The Trust will also receive £1.35 million over four years to continue as a Museum Development Sector Support Organisation, which offers expertise and advice to other museums in the region. She was photographed in 2016 by Rankin along with the team from York Art Gallery as part of the gallery's shortlisting for the Art Fund Museum of the Year. In February 2022 it was announced that King would stand down as Chief Executive of the Trust in summer 2022 to take up the post of Director of Heritage Properties for National Trust for Scotland.

King is a member of the National Museums Director's Council; in April 2021 she was elected to its executive committee. She is also a member of the British Art Network Steering Group.

== Publications ==
- King, R. 1997. Ignatius Sancho: The Man and His Times. London: National Portrait Gallery
- King, R. 2004. "Shemza, Anwar Jalal (1928–1985), artist ", Oxford Dictionary of National Biography
- King, R. (ed) 2010. Aubrey Williams. Liverpool: October Gallery/National Museums Liverpool
