= Fuyuko Kamisaka =

Japanese author (1930–2009)

- 上坂 冬子
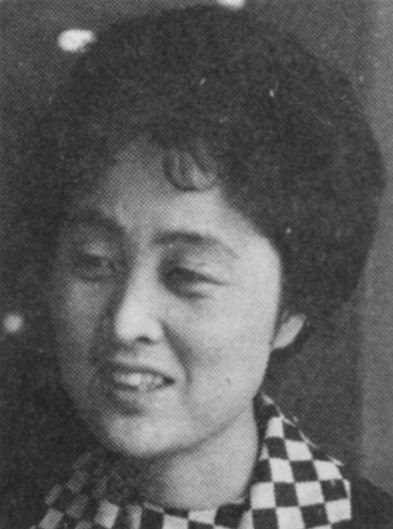
- Born: Yoshiko Niwa; June 10, 1930; Tokyo
- Died: April 14, 2009 (aged 78); Tokyo
- Other name: Kamisaka Fuyuko
- Occupations: Writer, journalist

Fuyuko Kamisaka (上坂 冬子, Kamisaka Fuyuko; June 10, 1930 – April 14, 2009) was a Japanese journalist and non-fiction author. She wrote several books and many articles about twentieth-century Japan.

== Biography ==
Kamisaka was born as Yoshiko Niwa in Tokyo on June 10, 1930. Her first work, Shokuba-no gunzo (People at a Place of Work), based on her experiences as a clerical worker for Toyota, was published in 1959. Her best-known work is "Keishu Nazare-en" about a facility for Japanese widows of South Koreans. Other works dealt with Sugamo Prison, vivisection experiments conducted by the Japanese on prisoners of war, survivors of the bombing of Hiroshima, post-war relief programs in Japan, white-collar crime, and interviews with ambassador's wife Haru Reischauer, spy Yoshiko Kawashima, Lee Teng-hui, president of the Republic of China, and conductor Seiji Ozawa's mother. Kamisaka was described as a "close friend" of propagandist Iva Toguri D'Aquino in the 1970s, and advocated for Toguri's presidential pardon.

In 1981, Kamisaka gave two ladies' watches and a $1000 charitable donation to Richard V. Allen, an American government official, in the weeks before the inauguration of President Ronald Reagan. Soon after, Kamisaka flew to Washington and conducted an interview with the incoming First Lady, Nancy Reagan. She also sent a hand-painted stationery box to Mrs. Reagan as a thank you gift. This triggered an ethics investigation into whether the gifts were exchanged for access to Mrs. Reagan. Columnist Jim Fitzgerald dubbed Kamisaka's approach "wristwatch journalism."

In 1993, Kamisaka received the Kikuchi Kan Prize. In 1995, she resigned from an advisory committee concerning commemoration of the fiftieth anniversary of the end of World War II.

Kamisaka died of cancer, aged 78, on April 14, 2009 in her native Tokyo.
