= Jean Dugain =

French slave catcher (1717 – after 1787)

- Born: 23 February 1717; Saint-Denis, Réunion
- Known for: Slave catcher
- Spouse: Louise Lebeau
- Parents: François Dugain; Ignace Clain

Jean Dugain (23 February 1717 – died after 1787) was one of the most famous slave catchers active on Réunion during the 18th century, when it was still a French colony in the Indian Ocean known as Bourbon Island. In this capacity, he traversed many of the territories of the Highlands that had remained unexplored until then, and became a reference in the field for the island's authorities, who did not hesitate to call on him for reconnaissance missions.

He was the first white man to witness a volcanic eruption of the Piton de la Fournaise, overlooking the Enclos Fouqué, the last caldera formed by this active volcano. He may also have been the first settler to reach the summit of Piton des Neiges (Snow Peak), the island's highest mountain, or at least to visit it regularly.

He had a son named after him, lived as a hermit for 13 years in remote parts of the colony, and helped the travelling explorer Jean-Baptiste Bory de Saint-Vincent during his ascent to its highest point in the early 19th century. Their name has been given to several natural features in Réunion's geography, including a small piton in Plaine des Cafres, Piton Dugain, and an inhabited place in Sainte-Suzanne, as well as a cave that is difficult to access and a stream that has now disappeared from maps.

== Early life ==
Jean Dugain was born on 23 February 1717 in Saint-Denis de La Réunion from the marriage of François Dugain and Ignace Clain, which took place on 12 April 1714 in the same town. He had at least one elder brother, bearing their father's first name, born of the same marriage on 9 March 1715 in Saint-Denis.

His father, born on 14 January 1695 in Sainte-Marie, was himself the son of Gilles Duguin and Cécile Mousse, married on 29 June 1687 in Saint-Paul. The former was a bricklayer born in Saint-Malo, Brittany, on 9 November 1661, and was therefore responsible for Jean Dugain's paternal family settling in the colony. The second, his wife, was born around 1674 to two parents originally from Madagascar, both slaves of the French East India Company. As such, Jean Dugain is the great-grandson of people who were enslaved by the institution he later served, purging the island of its maroons with the support of its authorities.

His mother, Ignace Clain, was born on 12 October 1694 in Saint-Paul daughter of a Bourbonnaise woman and a Jean Sekeling Clain, originally from Amsterdam in the Netherlands. She gave her husband several children, named Catherine, Anne, Louise, Pierre, Jacques, Marie, Mathurin, Suzanne and Marie. The latter, brothers and sisters of Jean Dugain, were born respectively in 1719, 1721, 1723, 1725, 1727, 1730, 1732, 1734 and 1736. Several of them were baptized in Sainte-Suzanne from the time of little Anne onwards, suggesting that the family had moved there from 1719 or 1725 onwards.

== Slave catcher activities ==
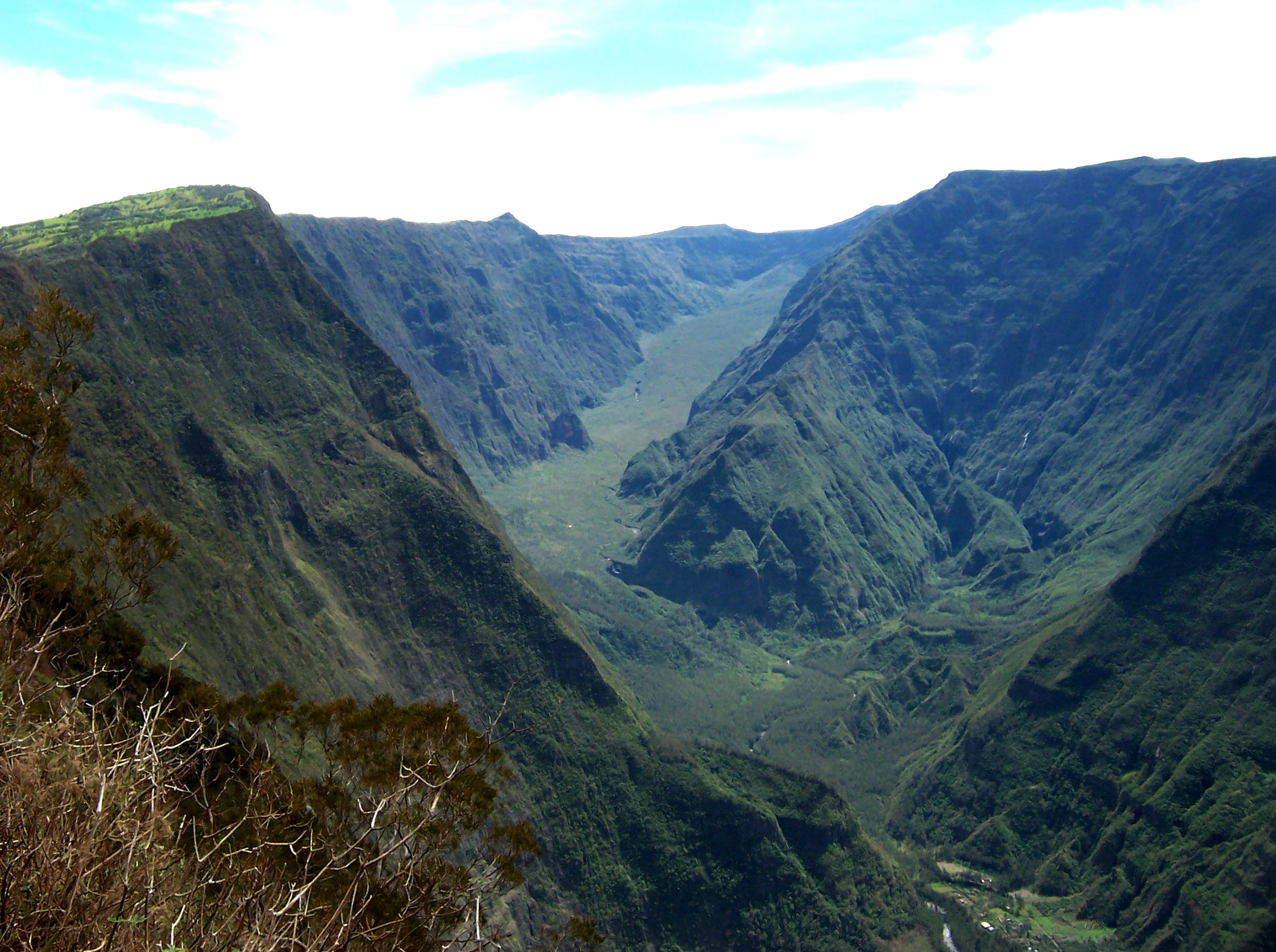
Contemporary photograph of the upper reaches of the Rivière des Remparts, where Jean Dugain almost caught chestnuts on denunciation.

Jean Dugain's career as a professional slave bounty hunter began a few years after the beginning of a movement to tighten local regulations concerning runaway slaves, the maroons who disappeared in the highlands of the island, i.e. off the coast in the mountains. After an amnesty had been promised to fugitives who surrendered in 1719, the Bourbon High Council ordered in 1725 that any blacks who refused to surrender to the authorities should be killed, and a "merciless manhunt" was launched. The following year, the same council promised thirty pounds for any slave, dead or alive. Finally, in 1729, regulations were drawn up for the detachments fighting the maroons. From then on, these detachments became professionalized, and Jean Dugain found himself at the head of one of them, along with François Mussard and François Caron, the latter being the only one of the three from the first generation of settlers.

Jean Dugain married Louise Lebeau on 20 November 1742 in Saint-Benoît, then lost his mother five months later, when she died at the age of 48 in Saint-Denis on 17 April 1743. His sister Louise followed suit in Sainte-Suzanne on 5 January 1748, as did his brother Pierre, who became one of the Volontaires de Bourbon on 19 March 1755 in Mazulipatam, India. During these years, Jean Dugain continued his slave-hunting activities, which led him to discover and destroy their many precarious constructions in the forests of Bourbon, as evidenced by his report of 24 August 1758: it states that he discovered a camp in the Pays brûlé at a place called "les deux bras" and 200 gaulettes (unit of measurement) from a site where fugitives were making a longboat 20 feet (6.1 m) long, 12 wide and six high. He had the same kind of encounter during a stay in the woods from 10 to 25 May 1762, when he discovered "a shed" at Les Trois Salazes, a second camp at a place called l'Étang and a third "in an extremely deep spot" near Rivière des Marsouins.

For the rest, he captured several fugitives, including an individual who had come on a makeshift boat from the island of France, now Mauritius, and reported to the authorities on 28 June 1758 that he was ready to return him to his owner if he claimed him. He also killed several marrons, including a woman in the woods, for which he was promised a slave as a reward – this promise was formally established on 27 August 1757 at the expense of the commune of Sainte-Suzanne. According to a report he drew up on 3 June 1758, one day he learned from a certain Mac the exact location of a cave in the upper part of the Rivière des Remparts where fugitives were to be found, but the slaves' dogs alerted them in time and enabled them to disappear through the second exit of their lair before he burst in by surprise.

== Explorer activities ==
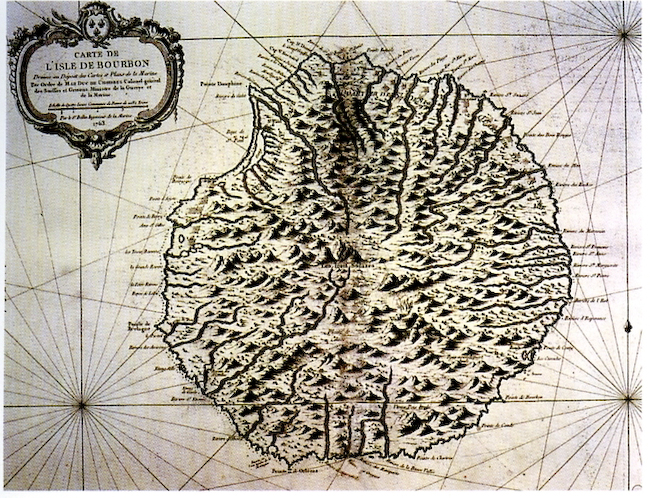
Geographical map of Bourbon Island published in 1763, when Jean Dugain was exploring its heights.

In the mid-18th century, there was no path to the Piton de la Fournaise, and curious visitors had to improvise, starting from the Plaine des Cafres or up the Rivière Langevin, only to come up against a mountain rampart over a hundred meters high overlooking the latest caldera, known today as the Rempart de Bellecombe. It was against this backdrop that Jean Dugain was the first to observe the interior of the Enclos Fouqué during a volcanic eruption of the Piton de la Fournaise, an "admirable and terrible spectacle", in 1753.

Arriving at the Rempart de Bellecombe at the head of a detachment of fifteen Creoles sent there by the Governor of Bourbon, Jean-Baptiste Charles Bouvet de Lozier, who had been alerted by the unprecedented effects of this exceptional eruption on the whole island, Jean Dugain observed the lava flowing at several points in the caldera and witnessed the formation of the small volcanic cone now known as Formica Leo.

A few years later, in October 1768, on the strength of his experience, he acted as route leader for a scientific expedition that included Joseph Hubert, a scientist, and Honoré de Crémont, the Bourbon governor himself. In his travel account, Crémont describes him as a Creole inhabitant of the Saint-Benoît district "known on this island for his frequent and perilous hunts against the Black Maroons", which testifies to a certain notoriety during his lifetime.

== Descendants and posterity ==
Passage from Voyage dans les quatre principales îles des mers d'Afrique in which Jean-Baptiste Bory de Saint-Vincent first mentions Jean Dugain's son of the same name.

The bounty hunter had a son with the same first name, and it is this man that Jean-Baptiste Bory de Saint-Vincent refers to as Jean Duguin, spelled with a 'U' in his 1804 account of his sojourns on Tenerife, the Isle de France (Mauritius), Réunion Island and Saint Helena, titled Voyage dans les quatre principales îles des mers d'Afrique. With him and several other walkers, he made a perilous ascent of the Piton des Neiges, the island's highest peak. In fact, according to the traveler's own account, he was also a hunter, and "perfectly familiar with the less-frequented places", having lived alone for thirteen years in remote parts of the island, "living, like a chestnut, far from the habitation of men", which had indeed made him "almost savage". Jean-Baptiste Bory de Saint-Vincent adds that "this very dark, lean and fierce-looking Creole had a particular expression of frankness in his eyes, to which his eyebrows, beard and white hair added an air of nobility".

After a three-hour walk, and before reaching the coteau Maigre, the little group crossed a cavernous ravine on whose slopes was a cave that Jean-Baptiste Bory de Saint-Vincent describes as "quite lodgable", before adding that it was named in honor of his companion's father, "an intrepid hunter, who lodged there during the runs he first made on this part of the island's interior". This phrase implies that Jean Dugain senior was the first white man to visit the highest peak of the Piton des Neiges massif, a peak that Jean-Baptiste Bory de Saint-Vincent himself reached only after a great deal of fear and after having sent Jean Dugain junior on a scouting expedition in search of the present-day Dufour cave and its surrounding caves.

In addition to the cave, now forgotten, the name of the bounty hunter and his son was also given to a small peak on the Plaine des Cafres plateau, Piton Dugain, which houses an oratory and two water reservoirs and rises to an altitude of 1,755 meters to the east of Bourg-Murat. Their name is also used to designate an inhabited area in the Hauts of the Sainte-Suzanne commune, the Dugain forest, at 640 meters above sea level. Finally, according to contemporary Reunion historian Prosper Ève, there was a watercourse called Rivière Dugain on old maps of the island before the one published in 1825. Today, several centuries after his death in 1787, Jean Dugain senior remains the most famous hunter in Réunion's history, along with François Mussard. who was more active in the south, while he was more active in the north.

== See also ==
- Slave catcher
- Maroons
