= Grand Etang =

Grand Etang or Grand Étang may refer to:

- Grand Etang (Grenada), a lake
  - Grand Etang and Annandale Forest Reserves, in Grenada
- Grand Étang (Réunion), a lake
  - Rivière des Marsouins – Grand Étang Important Bird Area
- Grand Etang, a lake on Saint Barthélemy
- Grand Étang, Nova Scotia, Canada, a community

== See also ==
- Grand Etang Pubnico Water Aerodrome, an airport in Nova Scotia
