= List of rivers of Réunion =

This is a list of rivers on the Indian Ocean island of Réunion:

A

- Rivière d'Abord
- Ravine de l'Anse
- Ravine des Avirons

B

- Ravine Basse Vallée
- Ravine Bernica
- Ravine du Butor

C

- Ravine des Cabris
- Ravine des Cafres
- Ravine du Cap
- Ravine Charpentier
- Ravine du Chaudron
- Ravine des Chèvres
- Bras des Chevrettes
- Bras de Cilaos
- Ravine des Citrons Galets
- Ravine des Colimaçons

E

- Ravine de l'Ermitage
- Rivière de l'Est

F

- Ravine Fleurimont
- Rivière des Fleurs Jaunes

G

- Rivière des Galets
- Ravine du Gol
- Ravine de la Grande Chaloupe
- Grande Ravine

J

- Ravine à Jacques

L

- Rivière Langevin

M

- Ravine à Malheur
- Ravine Manapany
- Rivière des Marsouins
- Rivière du Mât

N

- Ruisseau des Noirs

O

- Ravine des Orangers

P

- Ravine des Patates à Durand
- Ravine du Petit Saint-Pierre
- Petite Ravine
- Ravine de Petite-Île
- Bras de la Plaine
- Rivière des Pluies
- Ravine du Pont
- Ravine des Poux

R

- Rivière des Remparts
- Rivière des Roches

S

- Rivière Saint-Denis
- Rivière Saint-Étienne
- Ravine Saint-François
- Ravine Saint-Gilles
- Grande Rivière Saint-Jean
- Rivière Sainte-Anne
- Rivière Sainte-Marie
- Rivière Sainte-Suzanne
- Ravine Sèche

T

- Ravine de Takamaka
- Ravine des Trois-Bassins
- Ravine du Trou
- Trou Blanc
