= Hôtel de Ville, Saint-Benoît, Réunion =

Town hall in Saint-Benoît, Réunion, France

Hôtel de Ville
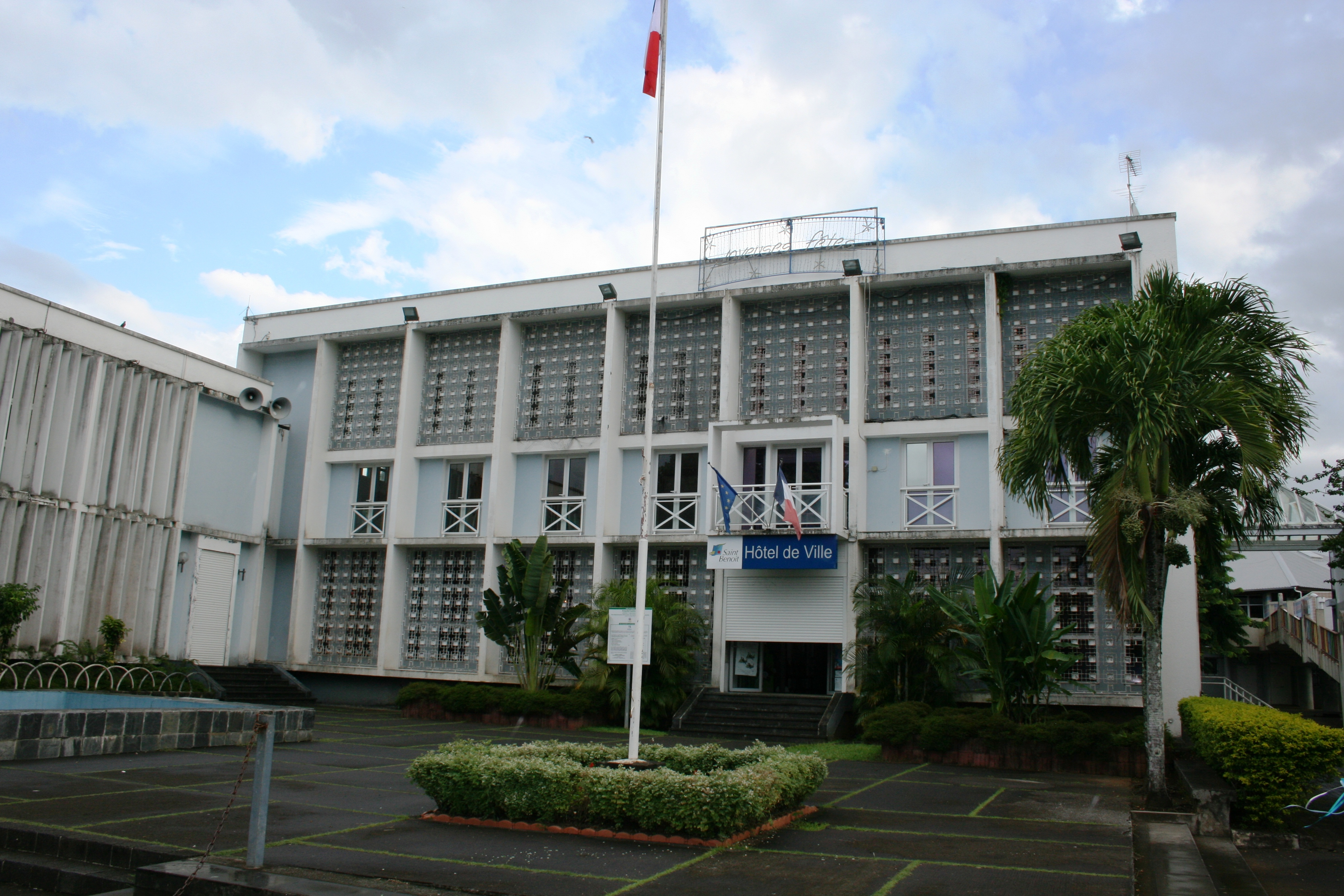
- The main frontage of the Hôtel de Ville in May 2011
- Interactive map of the Hôtel de Ville area

General information
- Type: City hall
- Architectural style: Modern style
- Location: Saint-Benoît, Réunion, France
- Coordinates: 21.0340°S 55.7126°E
- Completed: 1966

Design and construction
- Architect: Jean Hebrard Béton

The Hôtel de Ville (French pronunciation: [otɛl də vil], City Hall) is a municipal building in Saint-Benoît, Réunion, in the Indian Ocean, standing on Rue Georges-Pompidou.

== History ==
In September 1733, after an influx of settlers wanting to grow coffee, the Governor General of Réunion, Pierre Benoît Dumas, agreed to establish the parish of Saint-Benoît on the east coast of the island. One of the areas where development subsequently took place was the Butor district, on the east side of the Rivière des Marsouins, where a marina was built so that coffee could be loaded onto ships. It was in this district that the town council decided to commission its first town hall. It was a simple structure, built in timber and was probably completed in the second half of the 19th century. However, it was small, cramped and quite far from the town centre.

In the early 1960s, the town council decided to commission a modern town hall in the town centre on the west side of the Rivière des Marsouins. The site they selected, on the south side of Rue Georges-Pompidou, was adjacent to the Church of Saint-Benoît, which had been completed in the mid-19th century. The new building was designed by Jean Hebrard Béton in the modern style, built in concrete and glass and was officially opened by the mayor, David Moreau, on 27 March 1966.

The design involved an asymmetrical main frontage of eight bays facing onto Rue Georges-Pompidou. The third bay from the right featured a square headed doorway on the ground floor, a French door with a balcony on the first floor, and a tripartite window on the second floor. The other bays were fenestrated by tripartite windows on the ground floor, casement windows on the first floor and tripartite windows on the second floor. The bays were separated by concrete piers, and the floors were similarly separated by projecting concrete beams. There was also a wing to the left, which was projected forward and decorated with full-height concrete slats. Internally, the principal room was the Salle du Conseil (council chamber).

In April 2023, a man was taken to hospital and the local police were asked to investigate, after a member of staff working in sports department at the town hall attempted to kill himself in the building.
