= Rivière des Marsouins – Grand Étang Important Bird Area =

Coordinates: 21°05′S 55°38′E

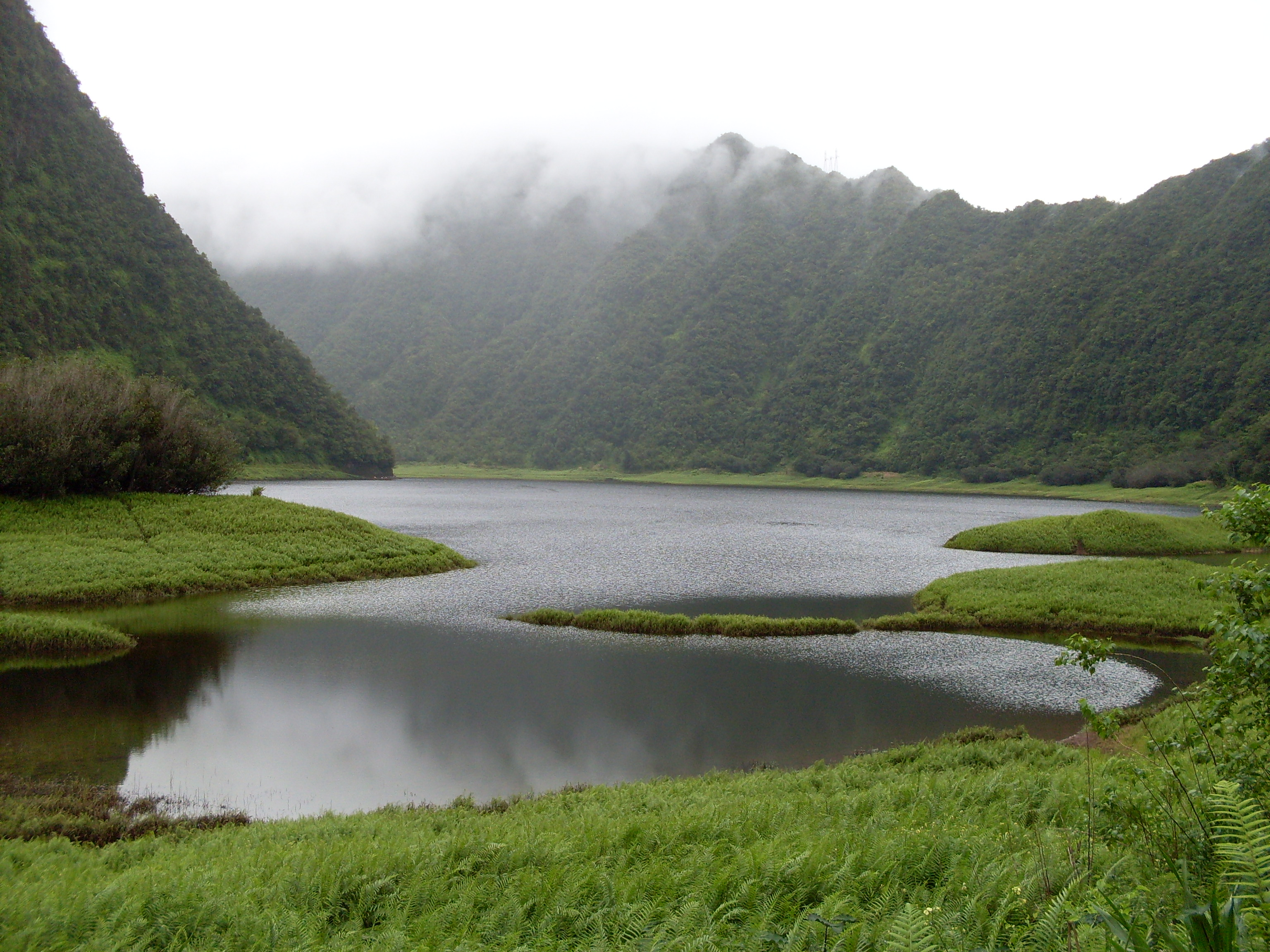
Grand Étang

Rivière des Marsouins – Grand Étang Important Bird Area is an 1,800-hectare (6.9 sq mi) tract of land on the island of Réunion, a French territory in the western Indian Ocean.

== Description ==
The IBA lies on the north-eastern side of the island in the commune of Saint Benoît, extending over an altitude range of 83–1334 m above sea level. It comprises the steep-sided valley of the Rivière des Marsouins and the lake of Grand Étang. The valley drains the forested Bébour plateau, lying east of the Piton des Neiges, from the Caverne des Hirondelles, the highest point of the site, down to the island's eastern lowlands. The 30 ha Grand Étang (“Big Pond” in English), the largest lake on the island, was formed in an adjoining valley which was blocked by lava flowing from the volcano of Piton de la Fournaise. The site contains largely unmodified native plant communities, including evergreen lowland forest.

=== Birds ===
The site has been identified by BirdLife International as an Important Bird Area (IBA) because it supports a colony of tropical shearwaters (with 300 breeding pairs), as well as populations of Réunion harriers, Mascarene swiftlets, Mascarene paradise flycatchers, Réunion bulbuls, Mascarene white-eyes, Réunion olive white-eyes and Réunion stonechats.
