= Maroons =

Fugitive slaves who lived in hidden communities

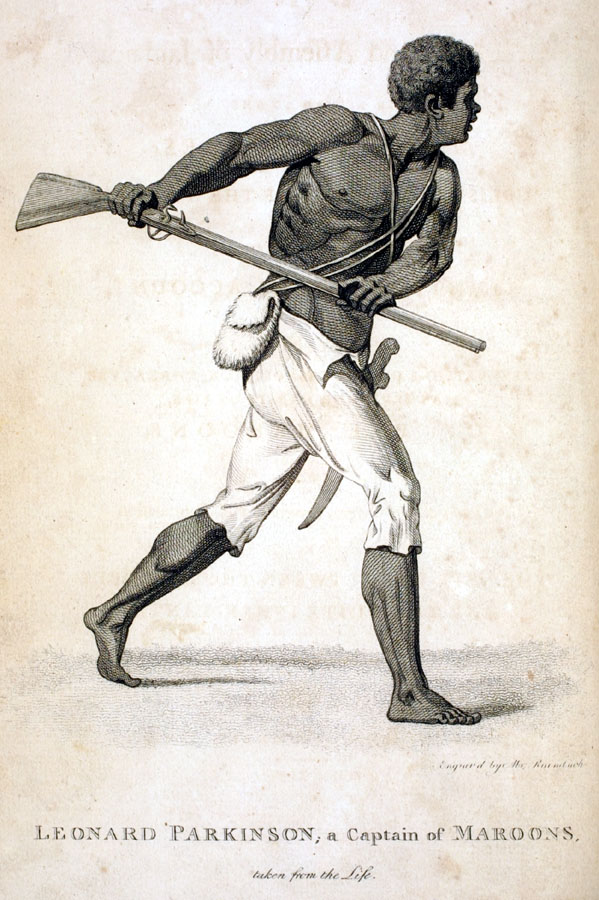
- 18th-century illustration of a Maroon

Regions with significant populations
- North and South America, Jamaica, Mauritius

Languages
- English-based creole languages, French-based creole languages

Religion
- African diasporic religions, Christianity

Related ethnic groups
- Maroon peoples Black Seminoles, Bushinengue, Jamaican Maroons, Mauritian Maroons, Kalungas, Palenqueros, Quilombola, El Maniel; Historical groups Cimarron people Great Dismal Swamp maroons

Maroons was an English term for Africans in the Americas and islands of the Indian Ocean who escaped from slavery, through flight or manumission, and lived in independent settlements. They were known as cimarrones in Spanish America, and the English word likely derives from the Spanish.

Maroon communities were threatened by plantation societies. They hid in remote environments, deep bush and caves, because colonial authorities tried to eradicate them. Maroons frequently used guerrilla warfare tactics to defend their settlements. This created constant conflict with authorities, where Maroons would sometimes ally with enemies attacking a colony. Sometimes, Maroons would also function as trading partners with remote settlers or Natives.

Maroon settlements often created unique cultures, separate from colonial society. Communities sometimes developed Creole languages by mixing European tongues with African languages, creating languages like Saramaccan in Suriname. On other occasions, Maroons would adopt creolized variations of a local European language as a common tongue. Sometimes Maroons mixed with Indigenous peoples, eventually evolving into separate creole cultures such as peoples like the Garifuna and the Mascogos.

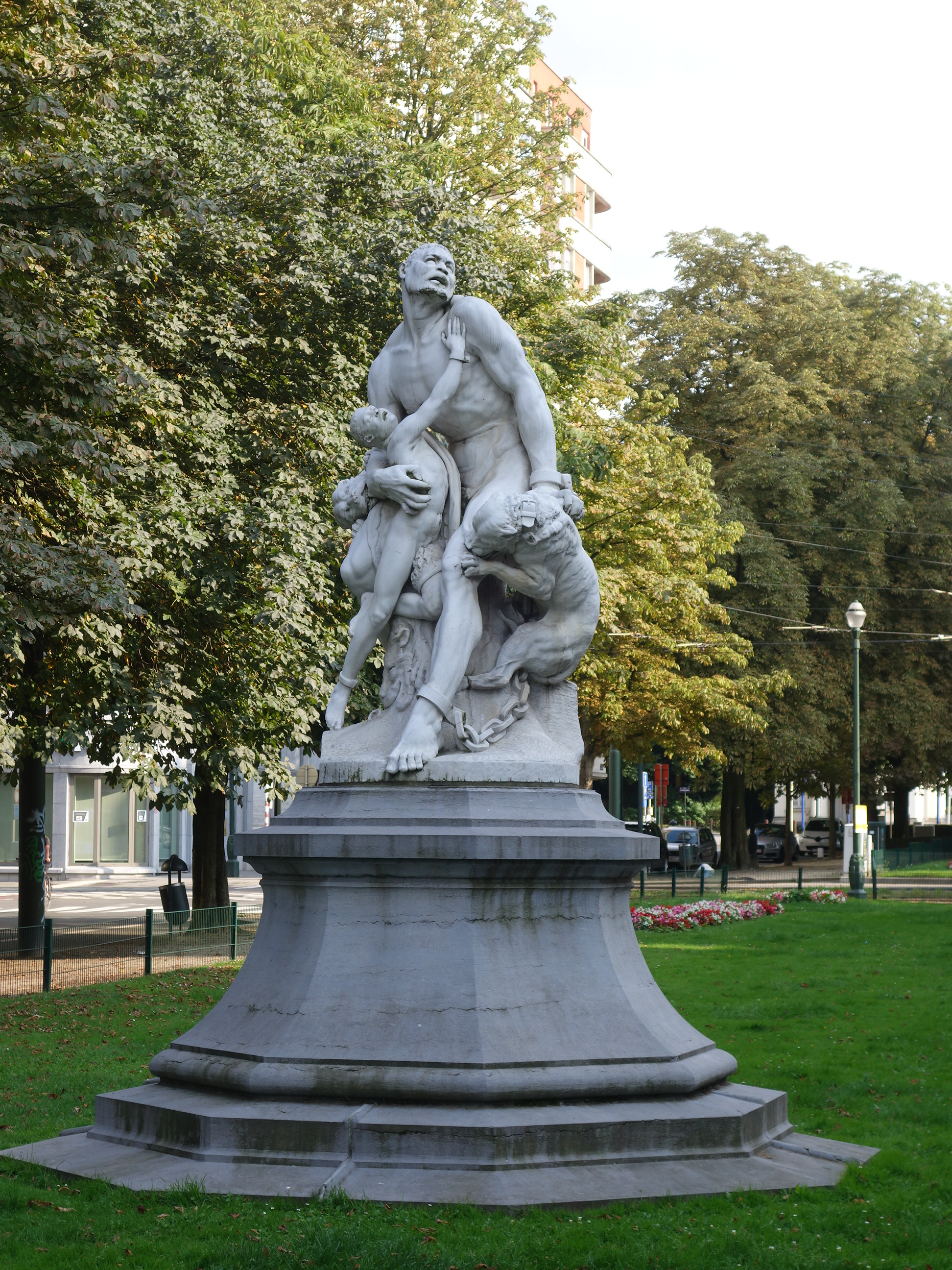
Maroons surprised by dogs (1893) (Brussels) by Louis Samain.

== Etymology ==
Maroon entered English around the 1590s, from the French adjective marron, meaning 'feral' or 'fugitive', possibly from the American Spanish word cimarrón, meaning 'wild, unruly' or 'runaway slave'. In the early 1570s, Sir Francis Drake's raids on the Spanish in Panama were aided by "Symerons", a likely misspelling of cimarrón. Linguist Leo Spitzer writes in the journal Language, "If there is a connection between Eng. maroon, Fr. marron, and Sp. cimarrón, Spain (or Spanish America) probably gave the word directly to England (or English America)."

Cuban philologist José Juan Arrom has traced the origins of the word maroon further than the Spanish cimarrón, used first in Hispaniola to refer to feral cattle, then to Indian slaves who escaped to the hills, and by the early 1530s to African slaves who did the same. He proposes that the American Spanish word derives ultimately from the Arawakan root word simarabo, construed as 'fugitive' by the Taíno people native to the island.

== History ==
=== Colonial era ===
As early as 1512 New World African slaves escaped from Spanish captors and either joined Indigenous peoples or eked out a living on their own. When runaway slaves and Amerindians banded together and subsisted independently they were called "Maroons". On the Caribbean islands, they formed bands as well as armed camps.

The earliest Maroon communities of the Americas formed in what is now the Dominican Republic, following the first slave rebellion on 26 December 1522, on the sugar plantations of Admiral Diego Columbus. A typical Maroon community in the early stages usually consisted of three types of people:

- Most of them were slaves who ran away directly after they got off the ships. They refused to surrender their freedom and often tried to find ways to go back to Africa.
- Some were slaves who had been working on plantations for a while. Those slaves were usually somewhat adjusted to the slave system but had been abused by the plantation owners – often with excessive brutality. Others ran away when they were being sold suddenly to a new owner.
- Some were skilled slaves with particularly strong opposition to the slave system.

Maroon communities faced great odds in surviving the attacks by hostile colonists, obtaining food for subsistence living, as well as reproducing and increasing their numbers. As the planters took over more land for crops, the Maroons began to lose ground on the small islands. Only on some of the larger islands were organised Maroon communities able to thrive by growing crops and hunting. Here, they grew in number as more slaves escaped from plantations and joined their bands. Seeking to separate themselves from colonisers, the Maroons gained in power amid increasing hostilities. They raided and pillaged plantations and harassed planters until the planters began to fear a massive revolt of the black slaves.

By the 18th century many early Maroon communities had disappeared or were displaced from the smaller islands. Survival was always difficult, as the Maroons had to fight off attackers as well as grow food.

==== Relationship to colonial authorities ====
Marronage (lit. 'running away') was a constant threat to New World slavocracies. Punishments for recaptured Maroons were severe, like removing the Achilles tendon, amputating a leg, castration, and being roasted to death. Maroon communities had to be inaccessible and located in inhospitable environments to be sustainable. For example, Maroon communities were established in remote swamps in the southern United States; in deep canyons with sinkholes but little water or fertile soil in Jamaica; and in the deep jungles of the Guianas. Maroon communities turned the severity of their environments to their advantage to hide and defend their communities. Disguised pathways, false trails, booby traps, underwater paths, quagmires and quicksand, and natural features were all used to conceal Maroon villages.

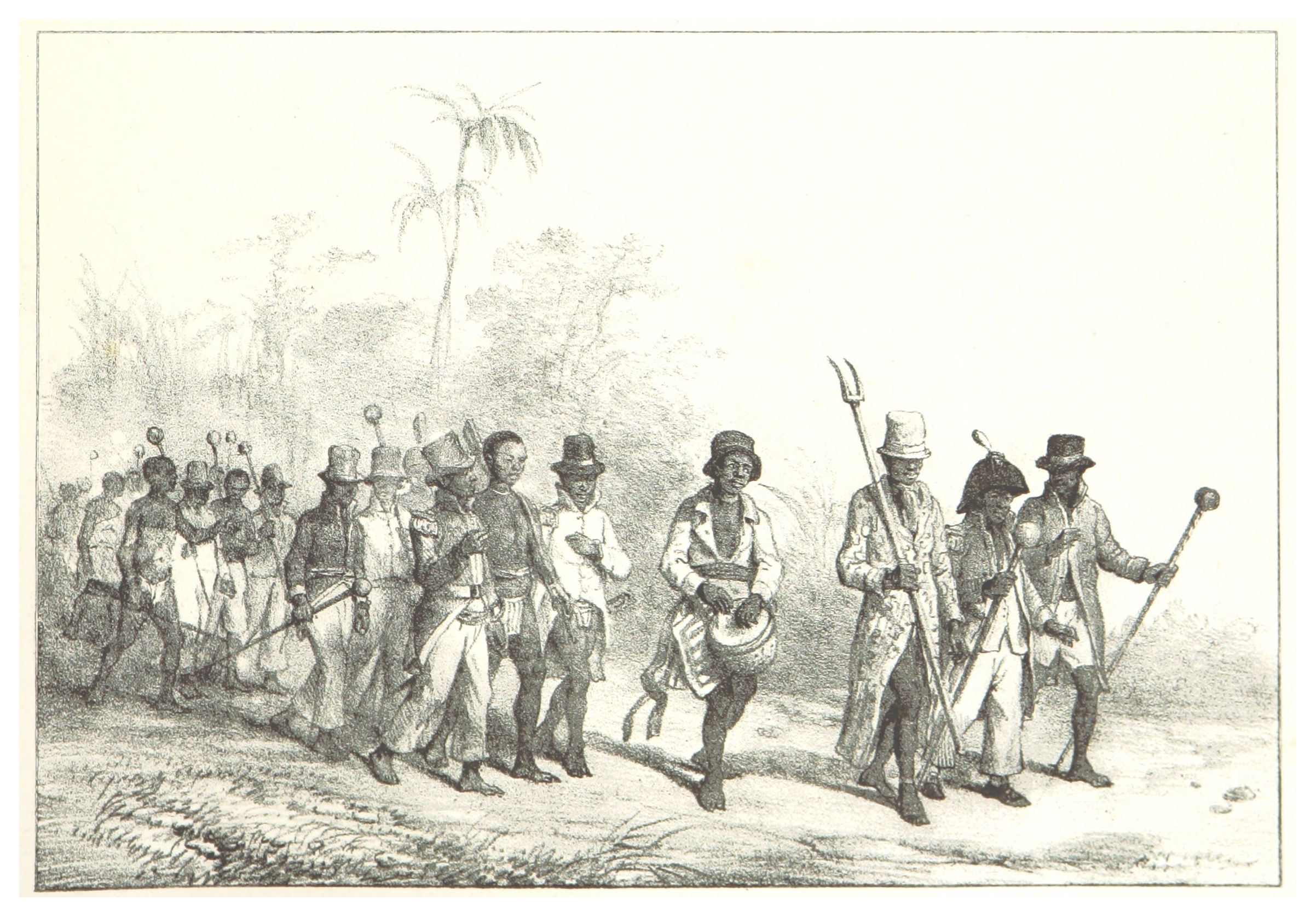
Maroons in Suriname in the 19th century

Maroons utilised exemplary guerrilla warfare skills to fight their European enemies. Nanny, the famous Jamaican Maroon, used guerrilla warfare tactics that are also used today by many militaries around the world. European troops used strict and established strategies while Maroons attacked and retracted quickly, used ambush tactics, and fought when and where they wanted to. Even though colonial governments were in a state of conflict with the Maroon communities, individuals in the colonial system traded goods and services with them. Maroons also traded with isolated white settlers and Native American communities. Maroon communities played interest groups off of one another. At the same time, Maroon communities were also used as pawns when colonial powers clashed. Secrecy and loyalty of members were crucial to the survival of Maroon communities. To ensure this loyalty, Maroon communities used severe methods to protect against desertion and spies. New members were brought to communities by way of detours so they could not find their way back and served probationary periods, often as slaves. Crimes such as desertion and adultery were punishable by death.

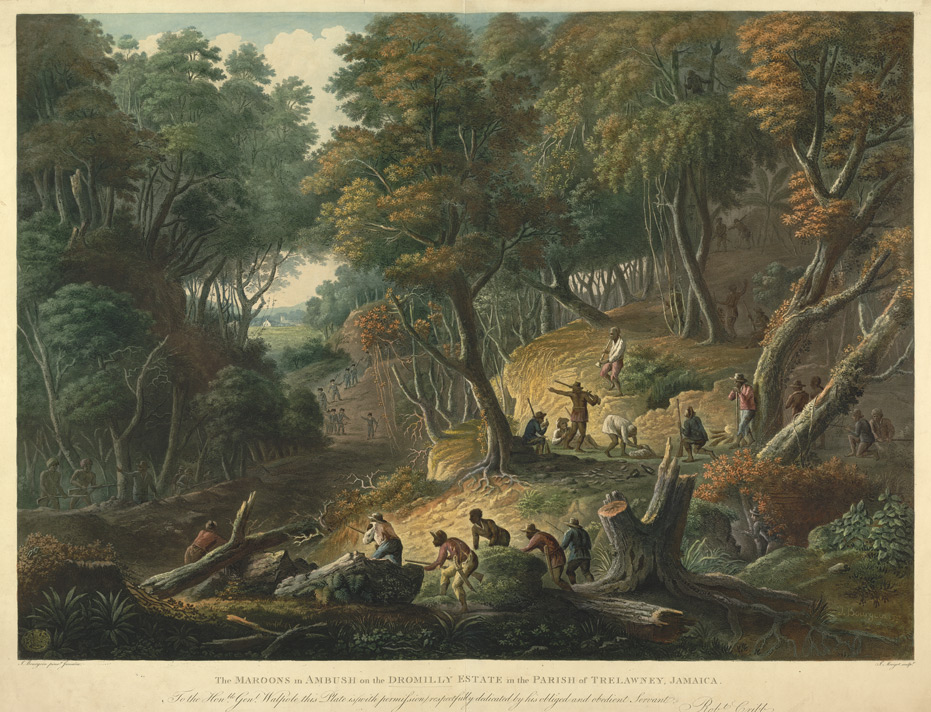
1801 aquatint of a Maroon raid on the Dromilly estate, Jamaica, during the Second Maroon War of 1795–1796.

==== Maroon wars ====
Maroon communities emerged in many places in the Caribbean (St Vincent and Dominica, for example), but none were seen as such a great threat to the British as the Jamaican Maroons. Beginning in the late 17th century, Jamaican Maroons consistently fought British colonists, leading to the First Maroon War (1728–1740). In 1739 and 1740, the British governor of the Colony of Jamaica, Edward Trelawny, signed treaties promising the Jamaican Maroons 2,500 acres (1,012 ha) in two locations, at Cudjoe's Town (Trelawny Town) in western Jamaica and Crawford's Town in eastern Jamaica, to bring an end to the warfare between the communities. In exchange, they were to agree to capture other escaped slaves. They were initially paid a bounty of two dollars for each African returned. The treaties effectively freed the Maroons a century before the Slavery Abolition Act 1833, which came into effect in 1838.

The Second Maroon War of 1795–1796 was an eight-month conflict between the Maroons of Cudjoe's Town and the British colonials who controlled the island. The Windward communities of Jamaican Maroons remained neutral during this rebellion, and their treaty with the British still remains in force. Accompong Town, however, sided with the colonial militias, and fought against Trelawny Town.

=== Modern era ===
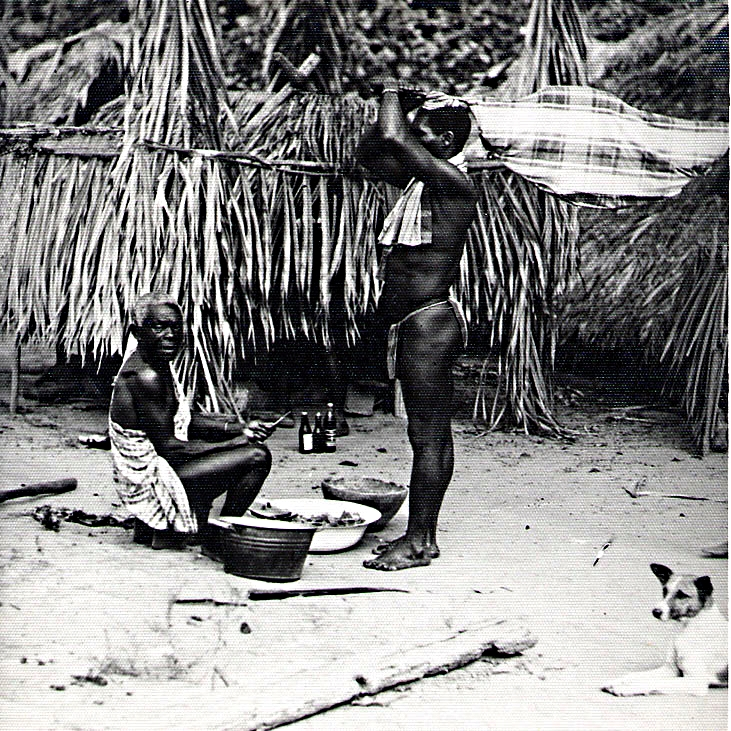
Ndyuka man bringing the body of a child before a shaman. Suriname, 1955

Remnants of Maroon communities in the former Spanish Caribbean exist as of 2006, for example in Viñales, Cuba. To this day, the Jamaican Maroons are to a significant extent autonomous and separate from Jamaican society. The physical isolation used to their advantage by their ancestors has today led to their communities remaining among the most inaccessible on the island. In their largest town, Accompong, in the parish of St Elizabeth, the Leeward Maroons still possess a vibrant community of about 600. Tours of the village are offered to foreigners, and a large festival is put on every 6 January to commemorate the signing of the peace treaty with the British after the First Maroon War.

The Ndyuka treaty remains important to relations between the Ndyuka and the modern Surinamese government, as it defines the territorial rights of the Maroons in the gold-rich inlands of Suriname.

== Culture ==
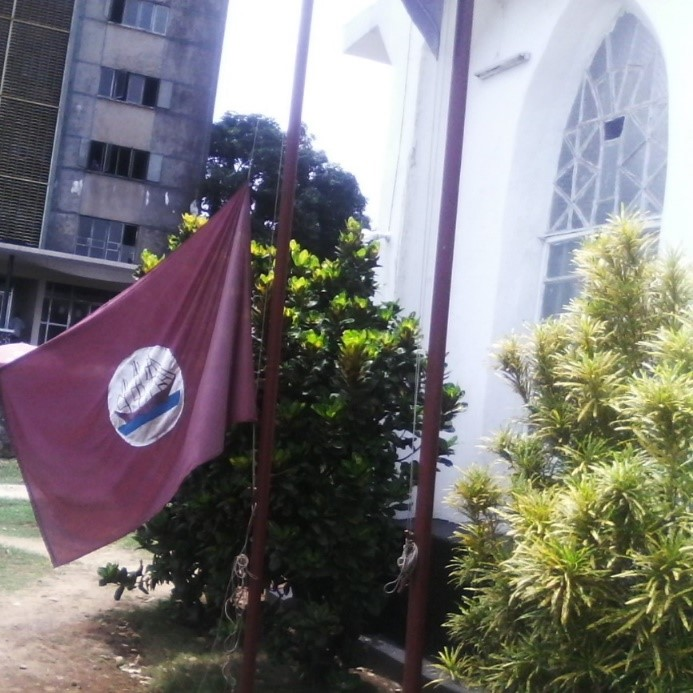
Maroon flag in Freetown, Sierra Leone

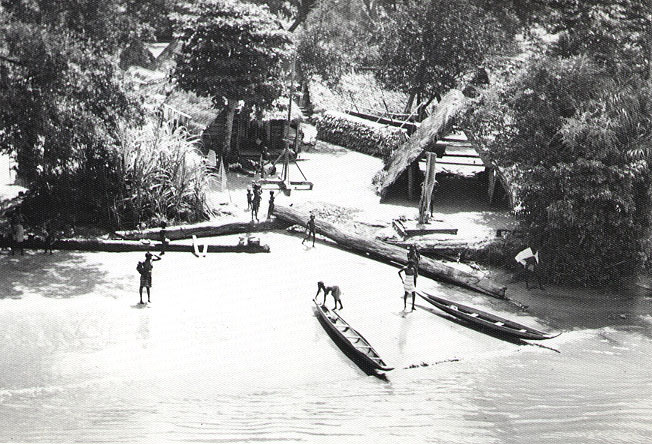
Maroon village, Suriname River, 1955

There is much variety among Maroon cultural groups because of differences in history, geography, African nationality, and the culture of Indigenous people throughout the Western Hemisphere. Outside of the plantation system, Maroons were also freer to share, retain and adapt various African, European and Indigenous traditions and cultures, resulting in diverse Maroon identities. The Jamaican Maroons, for example, have been recorded using the Coromantee language for ceremonial purpose and retain certain herbal medicine practices similar to West African traditions.

The jungles around the Caribbean offered food, shelter, and isolation for the escaped slaves. Maroons sustained themselves by growing vegetables and hunting. Their survival depended upon their cultures and their military abilities, using guerrilla tactics and heavily fortified dwellings involving traps and diversions. Some defined leaving the community as desertion and therefore punishable by death. They also originally raided plantations. During these attacks, the Maroons would burn crops, steal livestock and tools, kill slave masters, and invite other slaves to join their communities. Individual groups of Maroons often allied themselves with the local Indigenous tribes and occasionally assimilated into these populations. Maroons played important roles in the histories of Brazil, Suriname, Puerto Rico, Haiti, Dominican Republic, Cuba, and Jamaica.

Maroon settlements often possessed a clannish, outsider identity. They sometimes developed Creole languages by mixing European tongues with their original African languages. One such Maroon creole language in Suriname is Saramaccan. At other times, the Maroons would adopt variations of a local European language (creolization) as a common tongue, for members of the community frequently spoke a variety of mother tongues.

The Maroons created their own independent communities, which in some cases have survived for centuries, and until recently remained separate from mainstream society. In the 19th and 20th centuries, Maroon communities began to disappear as forests were razed, although some countries, such as Guyana and Suriname, still have large Maroon populations living in the forests. Recently, many of them moved to cities and towns as the process of urbanization accelerates.

== Geographical distribution ==
=== Africa ===
==== Mauritius ====
Under Governor Adriaan van der Stel in 1642, the early Dutch settlers of the Dutch East India Company brought 105 slaves from Madagascar and parts of Asia to work for them in Dutch Mauritius. However, 50 of these first slaves, including women, escaped into the wilderness. Only 18 of these escapees were caught. On 18 June 1695, a gang of Maroons of Indonesian and Chinese origins, including Aaron d'Amboine, Antoni (Bamboes) and Paul de Batavia, as well as female escapees Anna du Bengale and Espérance, set fire to the Dutch settlers' Fort Frederick Hendryk (Vieux Grand Port) in an attempt to take over control of the island. They were all caught and decapitated. In February 1706 another revolt was organised by the remaining Maroons as well as disgruntled slaves. When the Dutch abandoned Dutch Mauritius in 1710 the Maroons stayed behind.

When representatives of the French East India Company landed on the island in 1715 they also had to face attacks by the Mauritian Maroons. Significant events were the 1724 assault on a military outpost in Savannah district, as well as the attack on a military barrack in 1732 at Poste de Flacq. Several deaths resulted from such attacks. Soon after his arrival in 1735, Mahé de La Bourdonnais assembled and equipped French militia groups made of both civilians and soldiers to fight against the Maroons. In 1739, Maroon leader Sans Souci was captured near Flacq and was burnt alive by the French settlers. A few years later, a group of French settlers gave chase to Barbe Blanche, another Maroon leader, but lost track of him at Le Morne. Other Maroons included Diamamouve and Madame Françoise.

==== Réunion ====
The most important Maroons on Réunion were Cimendef, Cotte, Dimitile and Maffate. In the 18th century, Dimitile rebelled and found asylum in the region of the island to which he gave his name. In 1743 Dimitile and his companions are said to have freed Jeanneton, a slave from Mozambique, from the hands of her owner Pierre Hibon.

==== Sierra Leone ====
A group of nearly 600 Jamaican Maroons from Cudjoe's Town, the largest of the five Jamaican Maroon towns, were deported by the British authorities in Jamaica following the Second Maroon War in 1796, first to Nova Scotia. In 1800 they were transported to Sierra Leone.

The Sierra Leone Company had established the settlement of Freetown and the Colony of Sierra Leone in 1792 for the resettlement of the African Americans who arrived via Nova Scotia after they had been evacuated as freedmen from the United States after the American Revolutionary War. Some Jamaican Maroons eventually returned to Jamaica, but most became part of the larger Sierra Leone Creole people and culture made up of freemen and liberated slaves who joined them in the first half-century of the colony.

=== North America ===
==== Canada ====
===== Nova Scotia =====
In the 1790s, about 600 Jamaican Maroons were deported to British settlements in Nova Scotia, where American slaves who had escaped from the United States were also resettled. Being unhappy with conditions, in 1800, a majority emigrated to Freetown, West Africa where they identified as the Sierra Leone Creoles.

==== United States ====
===== Florida =====
Maroons who escaped from the Thirteen Colonies and allied with Seminole Indians were one of the largest and most successful Maroon communities in what is now Florida due to more rights and freedoms extracted from the Spanish Empire. Some intermarried and were culturally Seminole; others maintained a more African culture. Descendants of those who were removed with the Seminole to Indian Territory in the 1830s are recognized as Black Seminoles. Many were formerly part of the Seminole Nation of Oklahoma, but have been excluded since the late 20th century by new membership rules that require proving Native American descent from historic documents.

===== Georgia =====
In the late 18th century, two Maroon settlements were established on Abercorn Island (then called Belleisle), situated upriver from Savannah along the Savannah River, in modern-day Effingham County. In 1787, these settlements were destroyed by a local militia. Afterwards, the Maroons established another settlement at Bear Creek, though this settlement was also raided and its leader was killed.

===== Illinois =====
Lakeview, Illinois, was established as a Freedmen's town by a group of African-American runaway slaves and freedmen who immigrated from North Carolina shortly after the War of 1812. They arrived between 1818 and 1820. This area was ideal for the remaining Native Americans who lived, hunted, fished, and farmed this region and the black community integrated with the Amerindians.

===== Louisiana =====
Until the mid-1760s, Maroon colonies lined the shores of Lake Borgne, just downriver of New Orleans. These escaped, enslaved people controlled many of the canals and back-country passages from Lake Pontchartrain to the Gulf, including the Rigolets. The San Malo community was a long-thriving autonomous community. These colonies were eventually eradicated by militia from Spanish-controlled New Orleans led by Francisco Bouligny. Free people of color aided in their capture. People who escaped enslavement in antebellum America continued to find refuge and freedom in rural Louisiana, including in areas around New Orleans.

===== North Carolina and Virginia =====
The Great Dismal Swamp maroons inhabited the marshlands of the Great Dismal Swamp in Virginia and North Carolina. Although conditions were harsh, research suggests that thousands lived there between about 1700 and the 1860s.

=== Caribbean ===
==== Cuba ====
In Cuba, there were Maroon communities in the mountains, where African refugees had escaped the brutality of slavery and joined Taínos. In 1538, runaways helped the French to sack Havana. In 1731, slaves rose up in revolt at the Cobre mines, and set up an independent community at Sierra del Cobre, which existed untroubled until 1781, when the self-freed population had increased to over 1,000. In 1781, the Spanish colonial authorities agreed to recognise the freedom of the people of this community. In 1797, one of the captured leaders of a palenque near Jaruco was an Indian from the Yucatán. In the 1810s, Ventura Sanchez, also known as Coba, was in charge of a palenque of several hundred Maroons in the mountains not far from Santiago de Cuba. Sanchez was tricked into going to Santiago de Cuba, where he committed suicide rather than be captured and returned to slavery. The leadership of the palenque then passed to Manuel Grinan, also known as Gallo. The palenque of Bumba was so well organised that they even sent Maroons in small boats to Jamaica and Santo Domingo to trade. In 1830, the Spanish colonial authorities carried out military expeditions against the palenques of Bumba and Maluala. Antonio de Leon eventually succeeded in destroying the palenque of Bumba.

In the 1830s, palenques of Maroon communities thrived in western Cuba, in particular the areas surrounding San Diego de Nunez. The Office of the Capture of Maroons reported that between 1797 and 1846, there were thousands of runaways living in these palenques. However, the eastern mountains harboured the longer lasting palenques, in particular those of Moa and Maluala, where the Maroons thrived until the First War of Independence in 1868, when large numbers of Maroons joined the Cuban Liberation Army. There are 28 identified archaeological sites in the Viñales Valley related to runaway African slaves or Maroons of the early 19th century; the material evidence of their presence is found in caves of the region, where groups settled for various lengths of time. Oral tradition tells that Maroons took refuge on the slopes of the mogotes and in the caves; the Viñales Municipal Museum has archaeological exhibits that depict the life of runaway slaves, as deduced through archeological research. Cultural traditions reenacted during the Semana de la Cultura (Week of Culture) celebrate the town's founding in 1607.

==== Dominica, Saint Lucia, and Saint Vincent ====
Similar Maroon communities developed on islands across the Caribbean, such as those of the Garifuna people on Saint Vincent. Many of the Garifuna were deported to the American mainland, where some eventually settled along the Mosquito Coast or in Belize. From their original landing place in Roatan Island off the coast of Honduras, the Maroons moved to Trujillo. Gradually groups migrated south into the Miskito Kingdom and north into Belize. In Dominica, escaped slaves joined indigenous Kalinago in the island's densely forested interior to create Maroon communities, which were constantly in conflict with the British colonial authorities throughout the period of formal chattel slavery.

In the French colony of Saint Lucia, maroons and fugitive white French regulars formed the so-called French: Armée Française dans les Bois, lit. 'French Army in the Woods', which comprised about 6,000 men who fought the First Brigand War against the British, who had captured the island on 1 April 1794. Led by the French Commissioner, Gaspard Goyrand, they succeeded in taking back control of most of the island from the British, but on 26 May 1796, their forces defending the fort at Morne Fortune, about 2,000 men surrendered to a British division under the command of General John Moore. After the capitulation, over 2,500 white and Black French prisoners of war as well as 99 women and children were transported from Saint Lucia to Portchester Castle. They were eventually sent to France in a prisoner exchange; some remained in Europe while others returned to France. Anse Mamin was "the first maroon village" in the colony of Saint Lucia.

==== Dominican Republic ====
American marronage began in Spain's colony on Hispaniola. Governor Nicolás de Ovando was already complaining of escaped slaves and their interactions with the Taíno by 1503. The first slave rebellion occurred in Hispaniola on the sugar plantations owned by Admiral Diego Columbus, on 26 December 1522, and was brutally crushed by Columbus, although many slaves were able to escape. The Dominican Maroons went on to lead the first Maroon activities of the Americas. Sebastián Lemba, born in Africa, successfully rebelled against the Spaniards in 1532 and banded together with other Africans in his 15-year struggle against the Spanish colonists. Lemba was joined by other Maroons such as Juan Vaquero, Diego del Guzmán, Fernando Montoro, Juan Criollo and Diego del Ocampo in the struggle against slavery. As the Maroons threatened Spanish commerce and trade, Spanish officials began to fear a Maroon takeover of the island.

Maroons joined the natives in their wars against the Spanish and hid with the rebel chieftain Enriquillo in the Bahoruco Mountains. By the 1540s, Maroons controlled the interior portions of the island, although areas in the east, north, and western parts of the island were also to fall under Maroon control. Maroon bands would venture out throughout the island, usually in large groups, attacking villages they encountered, burning down plantations, killing and ransacking the Spaniards, and liberating the slaves. Roadways had become so open to attack, the Spaniards felt it was necessary to only navigate in groups. When Archdeacon Alonso de Castro toured Hispaniola in 1542, he estimated the Maroon population at 2,000–3,000 persons. In the 1570s, Sir Francis Drake enlisted several cimarrones during his raids on the Spanish. Dominican Maroons would be present throughout the island until the mid 17th century.

==== Haiti ====
The French encountered many forms of slave resistance during the 17th and 18th centuries in Saint Domingue, which later came to be called Haiti. Formerly enslaved Africans who fled to remote mountainous areas were called marron (French) or mawon (Haitian Creole), meaning 'escaped slave'. The Maroons formed close-knit communities that practised small-scale agriculture and hunting. They were known to return to plantations to free family members and friends. On a few occasions, they also joined Taíno settlements, who had escaped the Spanish in the 17th century.

In the late 17th and early 18th centuries, there were a large number of Maroons living in the Bahoruco mountains. In 1702, a French expedition against them killed three Maroons and captured 11, but over 30 evaded capture, and retreated further into the mountainous forests. Further expeditions were carried out against them with limited success, though they did succeed in capturing one of their leaders, Michel, in 1719. In subsequent expeditions, in 1728 and 1733, French forces captured 46 and 32 Maroons respectively. No matter how many detachments were sent against these Maroons, they continued to attract runaways. Expeditions in 1740, 1742, 1746, 1757 and 1761 had minor successes against these Maroons but failed to destroy their hideaways.

In 1776–1777, a joint French–Spanish expedition ventured into the Bahoruco Mountains, with the intention of destroying the Maroon settlements there. However, the Maroons had been alerted of their coming and had abandoned their villages and caves, retreating further into the mountainous forests where they could not be found. The detachment eventually returned, unsuccessful and having lost many soldiers to illness and desertion. In the years that followed, the Maroons attacked a number of settlements, including Fond-Parisien, for food, weapons, gunpowder and women. It was on one of these excursions that one of the Maroon leaders, Kebinda, who had been born in freedom in the mountains, was captured. He later died in captivity.

In 1782, de Saint-Larry decided to offer peace terms to one of the Maroon leaders, Santiago, granting them freedom in return for which they would hunt all further runaways and return them to their owners. Eventually, at the end of 1785, terms were agreed, and the more than 100 Maroons under Santiago's command stopped making incursions into French colonial territory.

Other slave resistance efforts against the French plantation system were more direct. One of the most influential Maroons was François Mackandal, a houngan or voodoo priest, who led a six-year rebellion against the white plantation owners in Haiti that preceded the Haitian Revolution. French authorities claimed Mackandal led a movement to poison the drinking water of the plantation owners in the 1750s, but contemporary historians debate the authenticity of the claim. Boukman declared war on the French plantation owners in 1791, setting off the Haitian Revolution. A statue called the Le Nègre Marron or the Nèg Mawon is an iconic bronze bust that was erected in the heart of Port-au-Prince to commemorate the role of Maroons in Haitian independence.

==== Jamaica ====
People who escaped from slavery during the Spanish occupation of Jamaica fled to the interior and joined the Taíno, forming refugee communities. Later, many of them gained freedom during the confusion surrounding the 1655 English Invasion of Jamaica. Some refugee slaves continued to join them through the decades until the abolition of slavery in 1838, but in the main, after the signing of the treaties of 1739 and 1740, the Maroons hunted runaway slaves in return for payment from the British colonial authorities.

During the late 17th and 18th centuries, the British tried to capture the Maroons because they occasionally raided plantations and made expansion into the interior more difficult. By the 18th century, Nanny Town and other Jamaican Maroon villages began to fight for independent recognition. An increase in armed confrontations over decades led to the First Maroon War in the 1730s, but the British were unable to defeat the Maroons. They finally settled with the groups by treaty in 1739 and 1740, allowing them to have autonomy in their communities in exchange for agreeing to be called to military service with the colonists if needed. Certain Maroon factions became so formidable that they made treaties with local colonial authorities, sometimes negotiating their independence in exchange for helping to hunt down other slaves who escaped.

Due to tensions and repeated conflicts with Maroons from Trelawny Town, the Second Maroon War erupted in 1795. After the governor tricked the Trelawny Maroons into surrendering, the colonial government deported approximately 600 captive Maroons to Nova Scotia. Due to their difficulties and those of Black Loyalists settled at Nova Scotia and England after the American Revolution, Great Britain established a colony in Sierra Leone. It offered ethnic Africans a chance to set up their community there, beginning in 1792. Around 1800, several hundred Jamaican Maroons were transported to Freetown, the first settlement of Sierra Leone. In the 1840s, about 200 Trelawny Maroons returned to Jamaica, and settled in the village of Flagstaff in the parish of St James, not far from Trelawny Town, which is now named Maroon Town, Jamaica.

The only Leeward Maroon settlement that retained formal autonomy in Jamaica after the Second Maroon War was Accompong, in Saint Elizabeth Parish, whose people had abided by their 1739 treaty with the British. A Windward Maroon community is also located at Charles Town, Jamaica, on Buff Bay River in Portland Parish. Another is at Moore Town (formerly Nanny Town), also in the parish of Portland. In 2005, the music of the Moore Town Maroons was declared by UNESCO as a 'Masterpiece of the Oral and Intangible Heritage of Humanity.' A fourth community is at Scott's Hall, Jamaica, in the parish of St Mary. Accompong's autonomy was ratified by the government of Jamaica when the island gained independence in 1962.

The government has tried to encourage the survival of the other Maroon settlements. The Jamaican government and the Maroon communities organised the annual International Maroon Conference, initially to be held at rotating communities around the island, but the conference has been held at Charles Town since 2009. Maroons from other Caribbean, Central, and South America nations are invited. In 2016, Accompong's colonel and a delegation traveled to the Kingdom of Ashanti in Ghana to renew ties with the Akan and Asante people of their ancestors.

==== Puerto Rico ====
In Puerto Rico, Taíno families from Utuado moved into the southwestern mountain ranges, along with escaped African slaves who intermarried with them. Before roads were built into the mountains, heavy brush kept many escaped Maroons hidden in the southwestern hills. Escaped slaves sought refuge away from the coastal plantations of Ponce.

==== Martinique ====
In Martinique, escaped African slaves had fled to the Maroon settlement in the northern woods to escape the French plantation system as well as the overseers along with white settlers, during the French Revolution, the Igbo slaves fought for freedom of which the French National Convention abolished slavery in 1794. But it was not until 1848, where the last slave uprising was occurred, which became the first French overseas territory to abolish slavery along with other French colonies.

=== Central America ===
==== Belize, Guatemala, Honduras, and Nicaragua ====
Several different Maroon societies developed around the Gulf of Honduras. Some were found in the interior of modern-day Honduras, along the trade routes by which silver mined on the Pacific side of the isthmus was carried by slaves down to coastal towns such as Trujillo or Puerto Caballos to be shipped to Europe. When slaves escaped, they went to the mountains for safety. In 1548 in what is now Honduras, slaves in San Pedro rebelled, led by a self-freed slave named Miguel, who set up his own capital. The Spaniards had to send in reinforcements to put down the revolt.

In 1648, the English bishop of Guatemala, Thomas Gage, reported active bands of Maroons numbering in the hundreds along these routes. The Miskito Sambu were a Maroon group who formed from slaves who revolted on a Portuguese ship around 1640, wrecking the vessel on the coast of Honduras-Nicaragua and escaping into the interior. They intermarried with the Indigenous people over the next half-century. They eventually rose to leadership of the Mosquito Coast and led extensive slave raids against Spanish-held territories in the first half of the 18th century.

The Garifuna are descendants of Maroon communities that developed on the island of Saint Vincent. They were deported to the coast of Honduras in 1797.

==== Panama ====
Bayano, a Mandinka man who had been enslaved and taken to Panama in 1552, led a rebellion that year against the Spanish in Panama. He and his followers escaped to found villages in the lowlands. Viceroy Canete felt unable to subdue these Maroons, so he offered them terms that entailed a recognition of their freedom, provided they refused to admit any newcomers and returned runaways to their owners.

Later these people, known as the Cimarrón, assisted Sir Francis Drake in fighting against the Spanish.

==== Mexico ====
Gaspar Yanga was an African leader of a Maroon colony in the Veracruz highlands in what is now Mexico. It is believed Yanga had been a fugitive since the early 1570s, and was the leader of a formidable group of Maroons.

In 1609, Captain Pedro Gonzalo de Herrera lad an expedition against Yanga and his Maroons, but despite severe casualties on both sides, neither emerged the victor. Instead, Yanga negotiated with the Spanish colonists to establish a self-ruled Maroon settlement called San Lorenzo de los Negros (later renamed Yanga). Yanga secured recognition of the freedom of his Maroons, and his palenque was accorded the status of a free town. In return, Yanga was required to return any further runaways to the Spanish colonial authorities.

The Costa Chica of Guerrero and of Oaxaca include many hard-to-access areas that also provided refuge for slaves escaping Spanish ranches and estates on the Pacific coast. Evidence of these communities can be found in the Afro-Mexican population of the region. Other Afro-Mexican communities descended from people who escaped slavery are found in Veracruz and in Northern Mexico; some of the later communities were populated by people who escaped slavery in the United States via the Southern Underground Railroad.

=== South America ===
==== Brazil ====
One of the best-known quilombos (Maroon settlements) in Brazil was Palmares (the Palm Nation) near Recife, which was established around 1600. Quilombo dos Palmares was a self-sustaining community of escaped slaves from the Portuguese settlements in Brazil, "a region perhaps the size of Portugal in the hinterland of Bahia". Part of the reason for the massive size of Palmares was due to its location at the median point between the Atlantic Ocean and Guinea, an important area of the African slave trade. At its height, it had a population of over 30,000 free people and was ruled by King Zumbi. Zumbi and Ganga Zumba were Kongo slaves, best-known for their warrior-leadership of Palmares, and fending off the Dutch first and then the Portuguese colonial authorities.

In 1612, the Portuguese tried in vain to take Palmares in an expedition that proved to be very costly. In 1640, a Dutch scouting mission found that the self-freed community of Palmares was spread over two settlements, with about 6,000 living in one location and another 5,000 in another. Dutch expeditions against Palmares in the 1640s were similarly unsuccessful. Between 1672 and 1694, Palmares withstood, on average, one Portuguese expedition nearly every year. After maintaining its independent existence for almost a hundred years, it was finally conquered by the Portuguese in 1694.

Of the 10 major quilombos in colonial Brazil, seven were destroyed within two years of being formed. Four fell in the state of Bahia in 1632, 1636, 1646 and 1796. The other three met the same fate in Rio in 1650, Parahyba in 1731, and Piumhy in 1758. One quilombo in Minas Gerais lasted from 1712–1719. Another, the "Carlota" of Mato Grosso, was wiped out after existing for 25 years, from 1770–1795. There were also a number of smaller quilombos. The first reported quilombo was in 1575 in Bahia. Another quilombo in Bahia was reported at the start of the 17th century. Between 1737 and 1787, a small quilombo thrived in the vicinity of São Paulo. The region of Campo Grande and São Francisco was often populated with quilombos. In 1741, Jean Ferreira organised an expedition against a quilombo, but many runaways escaped capture. In 1746, a subsequent expedition captured 120 members of the quilombo. In 1752, an expedition led by Pere Marcos was attacked by quilombo fighters, resulting in significant loss of life.

Quilombos continued to form in the 19th century. In 1810, a quilombo was discovered at Linhares in the state of São Paulo. A decade later, another was found in Minas. In 1828, another quilombo was discovered at Cahuca, near Recife, and a year later an expedition was mounted against yet another at Corcovado, near Rio de Janeiro. In 1855, the Maravilha quilombo in Amazonas was destroyed. Numerous descendants of Quilombo residents, or Quilombolas, continue to live in historic quilombo settlements post-emancipation. Their status as a "traditional people" was recognized in the 1988 Constitution of Brazil, although they continue to campaign for land rights and protections from violence.

==== Colombia ====
In 1529, in what is now Colombia, rebel slaves destroyed Santa Marta. Escaped slaves established independent communities along the remote Pacific coast, outside of the reach of the colonial administration. At the start of the 17th century, a group of runaways had established a palenque on the outskirts of the Magdalena River. Eventually, in 1654, the governor of Cartegena de Indias, Don Pedro Zapata, defeated and subdued this community of runaway Maroons.

In what is now the district of Popayán, the palenque of Castillo was successfully established by runaway slaves. In 1732, the Spanish authorities tried to secure peace terms with the Maroons of Castillo by inserting a clause requiring them to return runaways, but the rulers of Castillo rejected those terms. In 1745, the colonial authorities defeated Castillo, and over 200 African and Indian runaways surrendered.

At the start of the 17th century, the Maroon community of San Basilio de Palenque was founded, when Benkos Biohó led a group of about 30 runaways into the forests, and defeated attempts to subdue them. Biohó declared himself King Benkos, and his palenque of San Basilio attracted large numbers of runaways to join his community. His Maroons defeated the first expedition sent against them, killing their leader Juan Gomez. The Spanish arrived at terms with Biohó, but later they captured him in 1619, accused him of plotting against the Spanish, and had him hanged. But runaways continued to escape to freedom in San Basilio.

In 1696, the colonial authorities subdued another rebellion in San Basilio de Palenque, and again between 1713 and 1717. Eventually, the Spanish agreed to peace terms with the palenque of San Basilio, and in 1772, this community of Maroons was included within the Mahates district, as long they no longer accepted any further runaways. The San Basilio community, where the creole Palenquero language is spoken, is one of several that still exist along the Caribbean coast.

==== Ecuador ====
In addition to escaped slaves, survivors from shipwrecks formed independent communities along rivers of the northern coast and mingled with Indigenous communities in areas beyond the reach of the colonial administration. Separate communities can be distinguished from the cantones Cojimies y Tababuela, Esmeraldas, Limones.

==== The Guianas ====
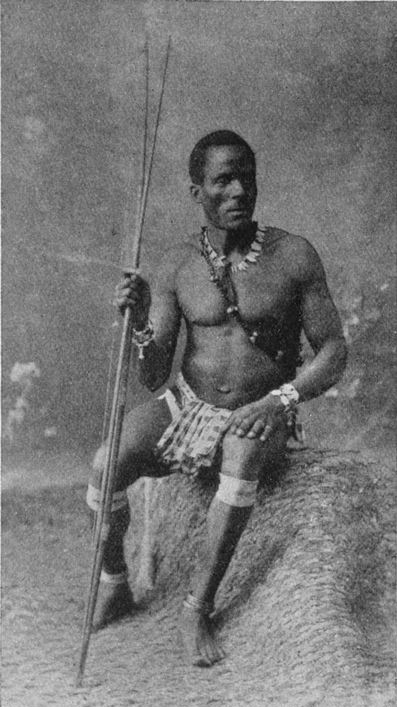
Saramaka man, photo c. 1910

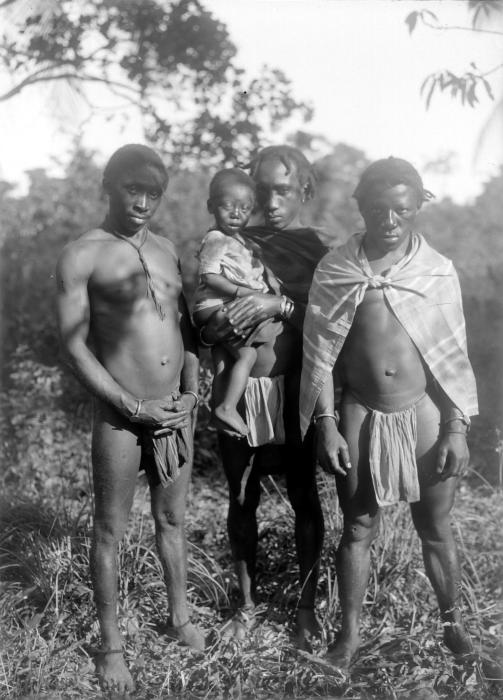
Maroon men in Suriname, picture taken between 1910 and 1935

Marronage was common in British, Dutch, and French Guiana, and today descendants of Maroons account for about 15% of the current population of Suriname and 22% in French Guiana. In the Guianas, escaped slaves, locally known as 'Bushinengues', fled to the interior and joined with Indigenous peoples and created several independent tribes, among them the Saramaka, the Paramaka, the Ndyuka (Aukan), the Kwinti, the Aluku (Boni), and the Matawai.

In the plantation colony of Suriname, which England ceded to the Netherlands in the Treaty of Breda (1667), escaped slaves revolted and started to build their villages from the end of the 17th century. As most of the plantations existed in the eastern part of the country, near the Commewijne River and Marowijne River, the marronage took place along the river borders and sometimes across the borders of French Guiana. By 1740, the Maroons had formed clans and felt strong enough to challenge the Dutch colonists, forcing them to sign peace treaties. On 10 October 1760, the Ndyuka were the first to sign a peace treaty, drafted by former Jamaican slave Adyáko Benti Basiton of Boston, offering them territorial autonomy in 1760. In the 1770s, the Aluku also desired a peace treaty, but the Society of Suriname started a war against them, resulting in a flight into French Guiana. The other tribes signed peace treaties with the Surinamese government, the Kwinti being the last in 1887. On 25 May 1891 the Aluku officially became French citizens.

After Suriname gained independence from the Netherlands, the old treaties with the Bushinengues were abrogated. By the 1980s the Bushinengues in Suriname had begun to fight for their land rights. Between 1986 and 1992, the Surinamese Interior War was waged by the Jungle Commando, a guerrilla group fighting for the rights of the Maroon minority, against the military dictatorship of Dési Bouterse. In 2005, following a ruling by the Inter-American Court of Human Rights, the Suriname government agreed to compensate survivors of the 1986 Moiwana village massacre, in which soldiers had slaughtered 39 unarmed Ndyuka people, mainly women and children. On 13 June 2020, Ronnie Brunswijk was elected Vice President of Suriname by acclamation in an uncontested election. He was inaugurated on 16 July as the first Maroon in Suriname to serve as vice president.

In modern-day Guyana, Dutch officials in 1744 conducted an expedition against encampments of at least 300 Maroons in the Northwest district of Essequibo. The Dutch nailed severed hands of Maroons killed in the expedition to posts in the colony as a warning to other slaves. In 1782, a French official in the region estimated there were more than 2,000 Maroons in the vicinity of Berbice, Demerara, and Essequibo.

==== Venezuela ====
There were several rebellions of slaves throughout the history of what later became Venezuela. Through the region of Barlovento, many free and escaped slaves founded communities, known as cumbes. One of the most well-known of these settlements is Curiepe, where the annual Fiesta de San Juan is celebrated. Another was the cumbe of Ocoyta, led by runaway Guillermo Ribas, which reportedly engaged in a number of attacks on the neighbouring towns of Chuspa and Panaquire. These Venezuelan Maroons also traded in cocoa. Guillermo ran away in 1768, and formed a cumbe which included runaways of African and Indian origin.

The cumbe of Ocoyta was destroyed in 1771. A military expedition led by German de Aguilera destroyed the settlement, killing Guillermo, but only succeeded in capturing eight adults and two children. The rest of the runaways withdrew into the surrounding forests, where they remained at large. One of Guillermo's deputies, Ubaldo the Englishman, whose christened name was Jose Eduardo de la Luz Perera, was initially born a slave in London, sold to a ship captain, and took several trips before eventually being granted his freedom. He was one of a number of free black people who joined the community of Ocoyta. In 1772, he was captured by the Spanish authorities.

There were many cumbes in the interior of the colony. In 1810, when the War of Independence began, many members of these cumbes fought on the side of the rebels, and abandoned their villages.

== See also ==
- Slave catcher
- Slave rebellion
- Afro-Latin American: Latin Americans of significant or mainly African ancestry.
- Bushinengues: in French Guiana, meaning people of the forest, descendants of slaves who escaped enslavement and established independent communities in the forest.
- Gaspar Yanga: an African known for being the leader of a Maroon colony of slaves in New Spain.
- Runaway slaves in Spanish Florida
- Saramaka: one of six Maroon peoples in the Republic of Suriname and one of the Maroon peoples in French Guiana.
- Quilombo a 1985 film about Quilombo dos Palmares, a fugitive community of escaped slaves and others, in colonial Brazil.
- Jean Dugain
- Marooning

== Sources ==
=== Literature ===
- History of the Maroons
- Russell Banks (1980), The Book of Jamaica.
- Campbell, Mavis Christine (1988), The Maroons of Jamaica, 1655–1796: a history of resistance, collaboration & betrayal, Granby, Mass.: Bergin & Garvey. ISBN 0-89789-148-1
- Corzo, Gabino La Rosa (2003), Runaway Slave Settlements in Cuba: Resistance and Repression (translated by Mary Todd), Chapel Hill: University of North Carolina Press. ISBN 0-8078-2803-3
- Dallas, R. C. The History of the Maroons, from Their Origin to the Establishment of Their Chief Tribe at Sierra Leone. 2 vols. London: Longman. 1803.
- De Granada, Germán (1970), Cimarronismo, palenques y Hablas "Criollas" en Hispanoamérica Instituto Caro y Cuero, Santa Fe de Bogotá, Colombia, OCLC 37821053 (in Spanish)
- Diouf, Sylviane A. (2014), Slavery's Exiles: The Story of the American Maroons, New York: NYU Press, ISBN 978-0-8147-2437-8
- Honychurch, Lennox (1995), The Dominica Story, London: Macmillan. ISBN 0-333-62776-8 (Includes extensive chapters on the Maroons of Dominica)
- Hoogbergen, Wim S. M. Brill (1997), The Boni Maroon Wars in Suriname, Academic Publishers. ISBN 90-04-09303-6
- Learning, Hugo Prosper (1995), Hidden Americans: Maroons of Virginia and the Carolinas Garland Publishing, New York, ISBN 0-8153-1543-0
- Price, Richard (ed.) (1973), Maroon Societies: rebel slave communities in the Americas, Garden City, N.Y.: Anchor Books. ISBN 0-385-06508-6
- Schwaller, Robert, ed. African Maroons in Sixteenth-Century Panama: A History in Documents. University of Oklahoma Press, 2021.
- Thompson, Alvin O. (2006), Flight to Freedom: African runaways and maroons in the Americas University of West Indies Press, Kingston, Jamaica, ISBN 976-640-180-2
- Thompson, Alvin O. (1976). Some Problems of Slave Desertion in Guyana, C. 1750-1814. Institute of Social and Economic Research, University of the West Indies. p. 16.
- van Velzen, H.U.E. Thoden and van Wetering, Wilhelmina (2004), In the Shadow of the Oracle: Religion as Politics in a Suriname Maroon Society, Long Grove, Illinois: Waveland Press. ISBN 1-57766-323-3
