= Enclos Fouqué =

Coordinates: 21°14′55″S 55°45′09″E

The Enclos Fouqué is the most recent caldera built by the Piton de la Fournaise, the active volcano of the isle of la Réunion.
