= Geography of Réunion =

Réunion
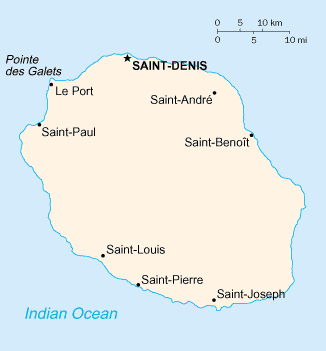
- Map of Réunion

Geography
- Location: Indian Ocean
- Coordinates: 21°06′S 55°36′E
- Area: 2,512 km^{2} (970 sq mi)
- Coastline: 207 km (128.6 mi)
- Highest elevation: 3,069 m (10069 ft)
- Highest point: Piton des Neiges

Administration
- France
- Overseas department: Réunion
- Largest settlement: Saint-Denis (pop. 133,700)

Demographics
- Population: 793,000 (2007)
- Pop. density: 315.68/km^{2} (817.61/sq mi)
- Ethnic groups: Creoles, French, African, Tamil, other Indians, Malagasy, Chinese and Vietnamese

Réunion is an island in Southern Africa, in the Indian Ocean, east of Madagascar. It is an overseas region of France. The total area of the island is 2,512 km^{2}, of which 10 km^{2} is water. The island has a coastline of 207 km. The maritime claims of Réunion include an exclusive economic zone of 200 nautical miles, and a territorial sea of 12 nautical miles (22 km). Reunion is geologically situated in the Somali Plate.

== Climate ==
The climate in Réunion is tropical, but temperature moderates with elevation. The weather is cool and dry from May to November, and hot and rainy from November to April. The terrain is mostly rugged and mountainous, with fertile lowlands along the coast. The lowest point is the Indian Ocean and the highest is Piton des Neiges at 3,069 m.

== Natural resources ==
Réunion's natural resources are among fish, arable land and hydropower. In 1993, 60 km^{2} of the land was irrigated. The use of the land in 1993 is described in the table below:

Land use
| Use | Percentage of Area |
|---|---|
| arable land | 17 |
| permanent crops | 2 |
| permanent pastures | 5 |
| forests and woodland | 35 |
| other | 41 |

== Natural hazards ==
Local natural hazards include: periodic, devastating cyclones (December to April), and Piton de la Fournaise (2,631 m) on the southeastern coast, which is an active volcano.

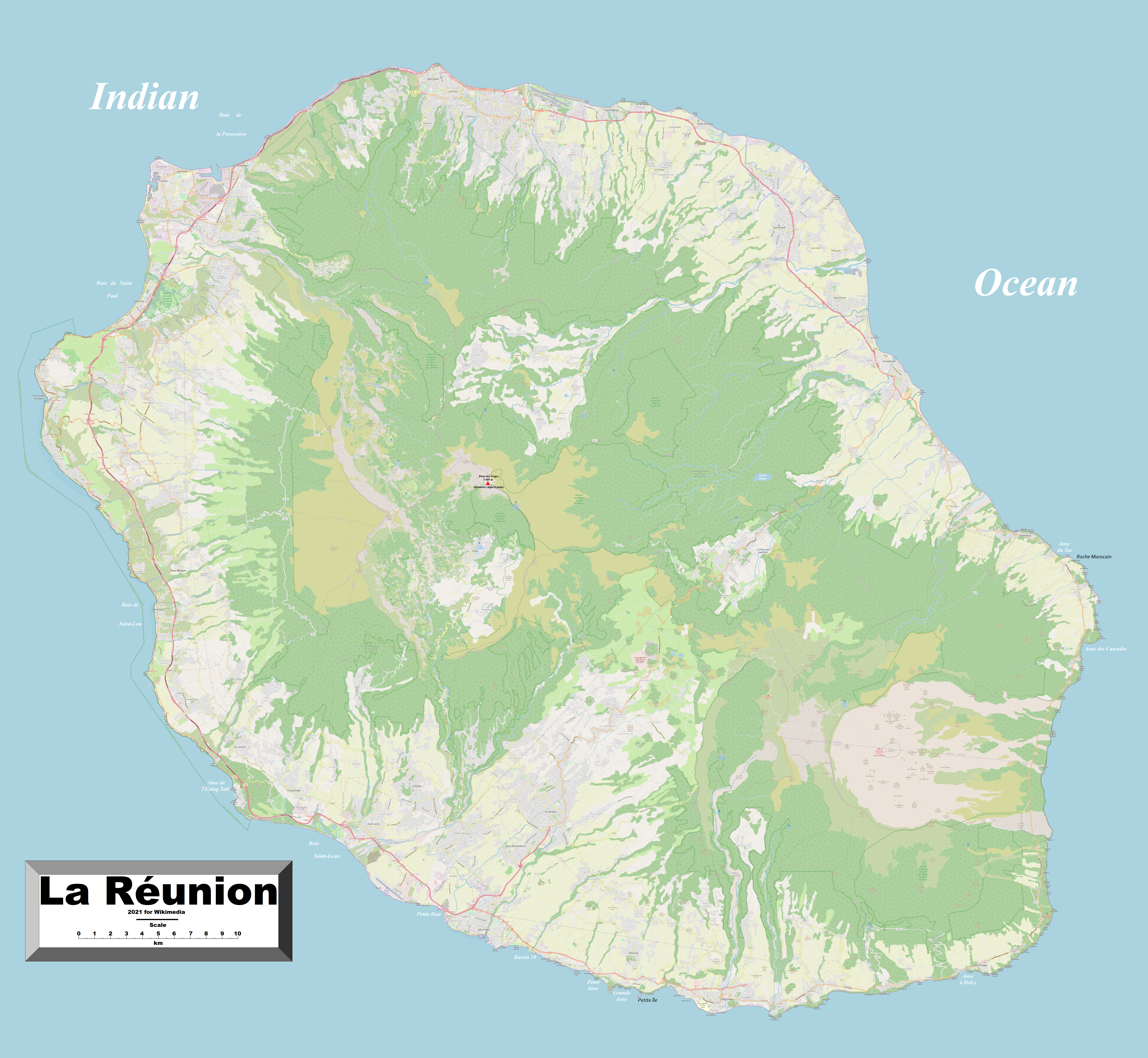
Enlargeable, detailed map of Réunion
