= Grand Étang (Réunion) =

Lake in Saint-Benoît, La Réunion, France

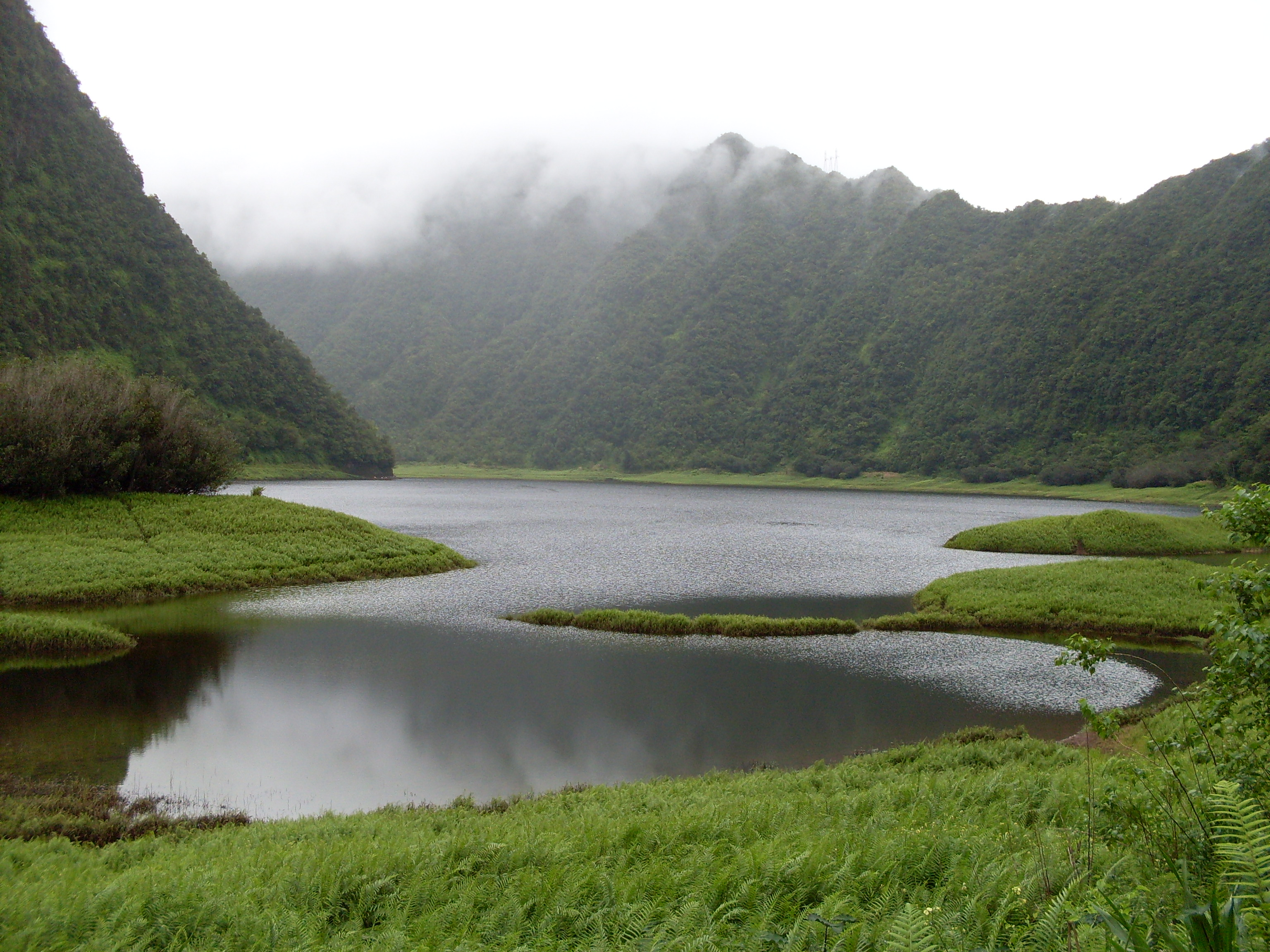
- Grand Étang

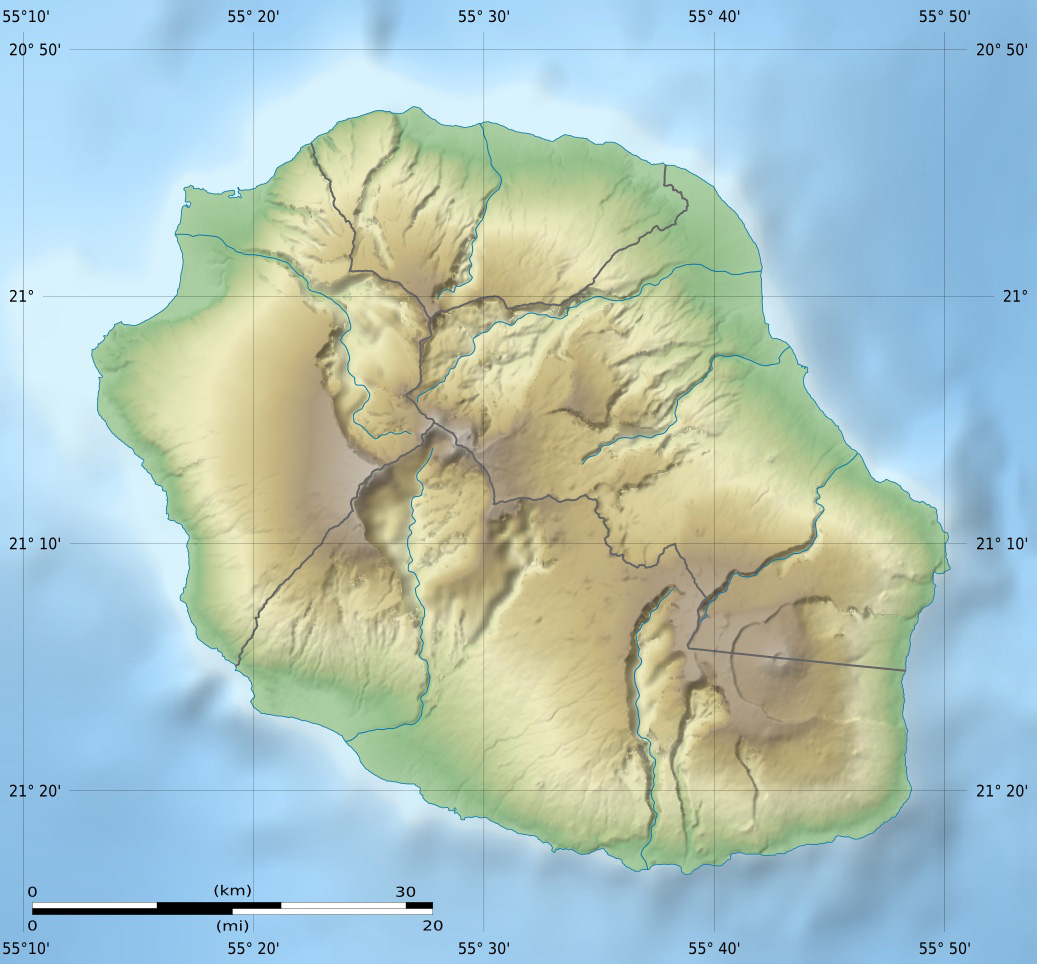
- Location within Réunion
- Location: Réunion
- Coordinates: 21°5′46″S 55°38′25″E
- Primary inflows: Bras d'Annette
- Basin countries: France (Réunion)
- Surface elevation: 525 m (1,722 ft)
- Settlements: Saint-Benoît

Grand Étang ('large pond') is the largest lake on the island of Réunion, a French territory in the western Indian Ocean. It lies in the commune of Saint-Benoît, close to La Plaine-des-Palmistes, in the eastern part of the island. Its inflow is a short creek from the waterfall Cascade Biberon of the Bras d'Annette creek. It was created by a lava flow acting as a natural dam afterwards. It does not have an outflow.

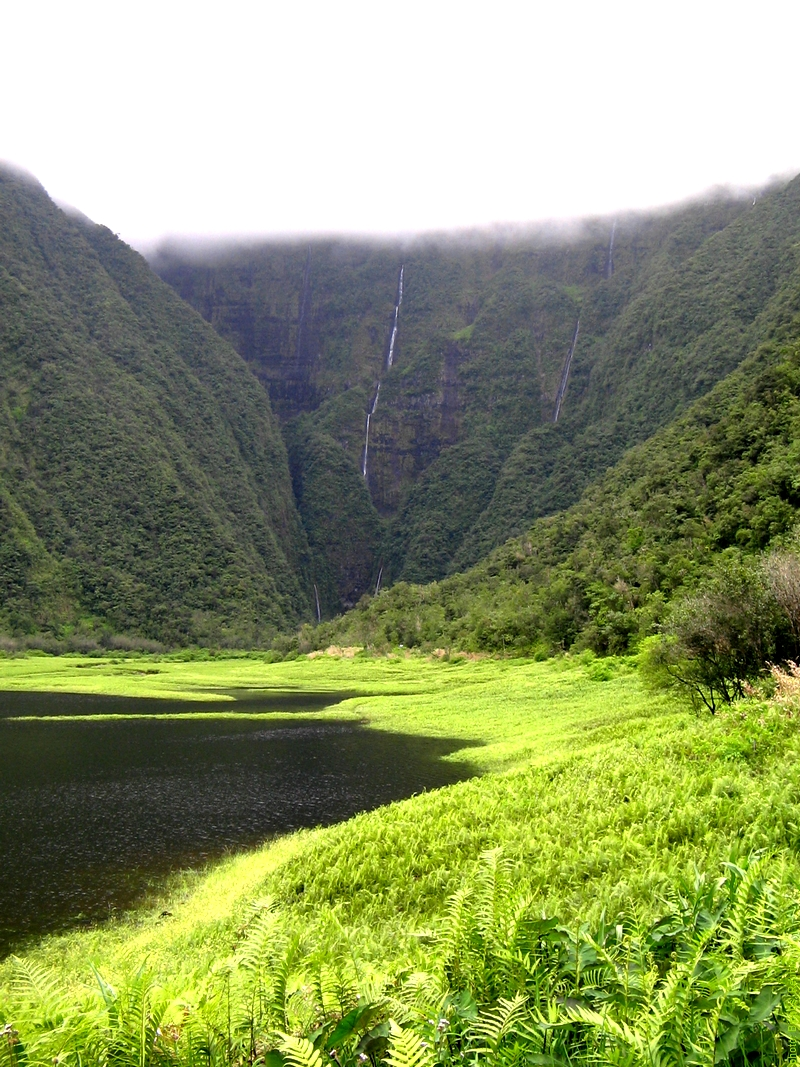
Lake of Grand Etang – in the background the waterfall of Cascade Biberon

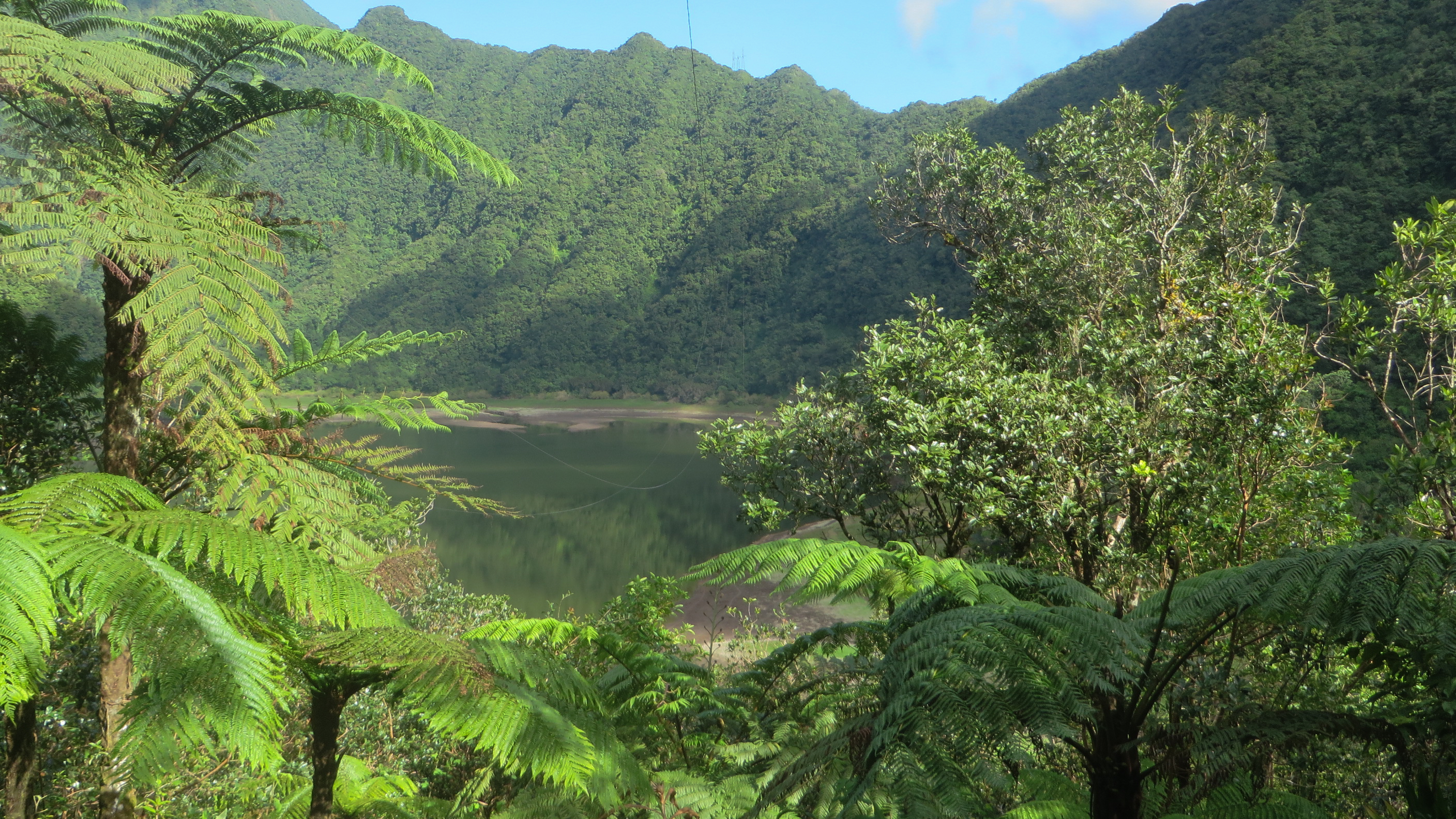
Grand Étang as seen from the natural lava dam.

== See also ==
- Rivière des Marsouins – Grand Étang Important Bird Area
