= Rivière des Roches (Réunion) =

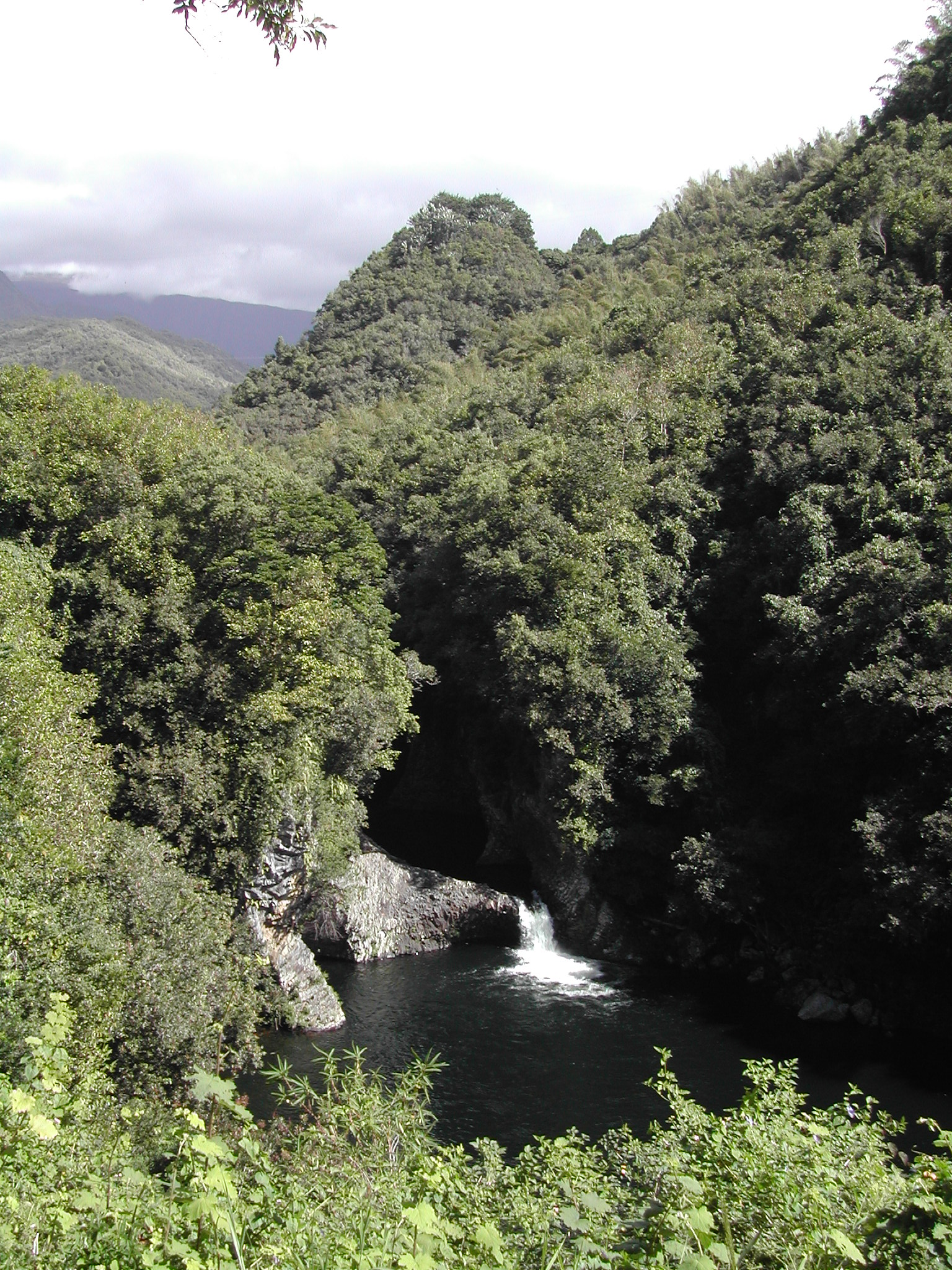

Location
- Country: France
- Region: Réunion

Physical characteristics
- Mouth: Indian Ocean
  - coordinates: 21°0′19″S 55°42′3″E
- Length: 17.9 km (11.1 mi)

The Rivière des Roches is a river on the Indian Ocean island of Réunion, which is an overseas department and region of France. The 17.9 km (11.1 mi) long river flows northeast from the centre of the island, reaching the sea close to the town of Bras-Panon. The Rivière des Marsouins follows a largely parallel course, reaching the sea three kilometres to the south.
