= Saint-Benoît, Réunion =

Subprefecture and commune in Réunion, France

Saint-Benoît
- Subprefecture and commune
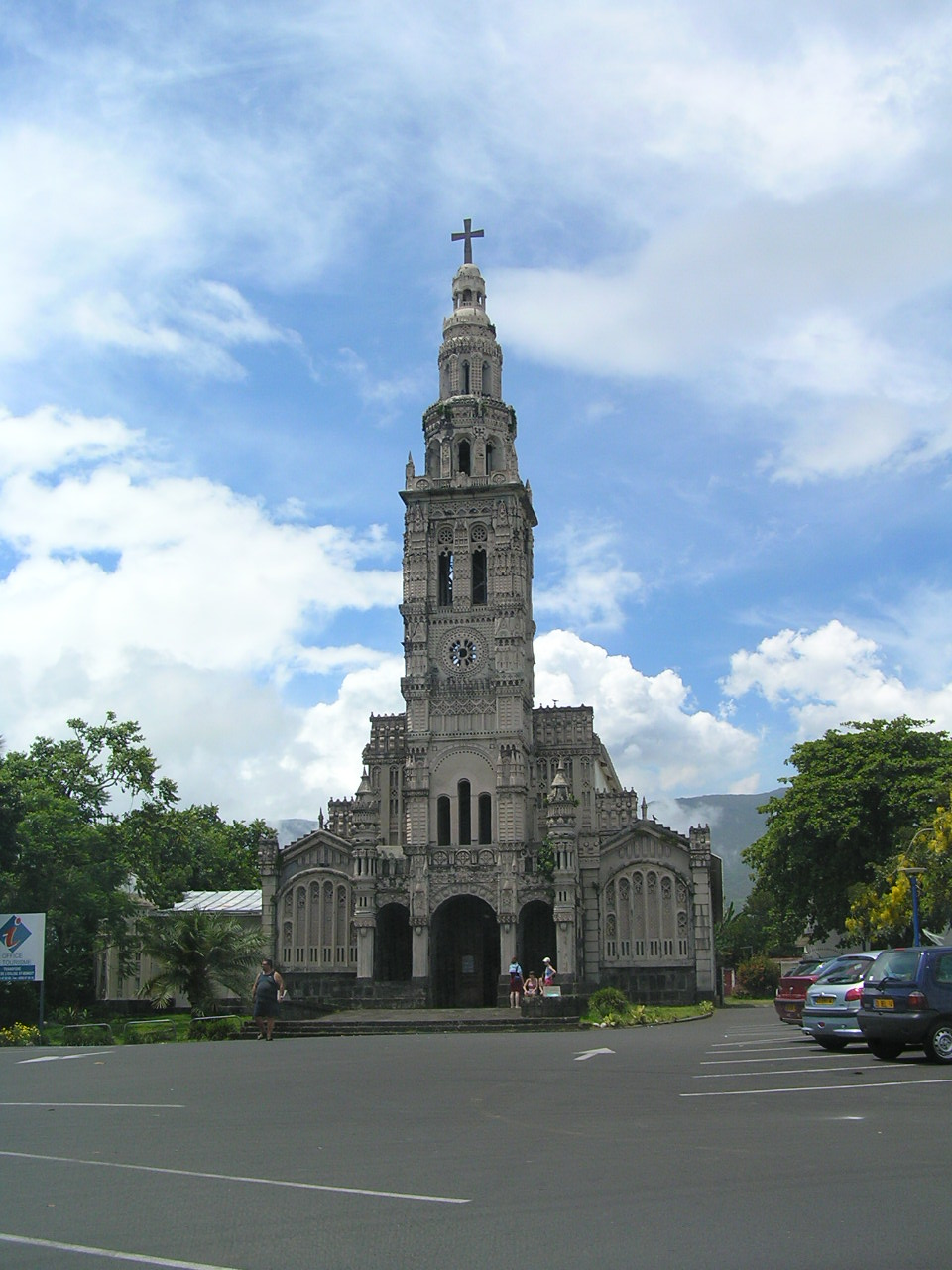
- The Church of Sainte-Anne in the commune of Saint-Benoît

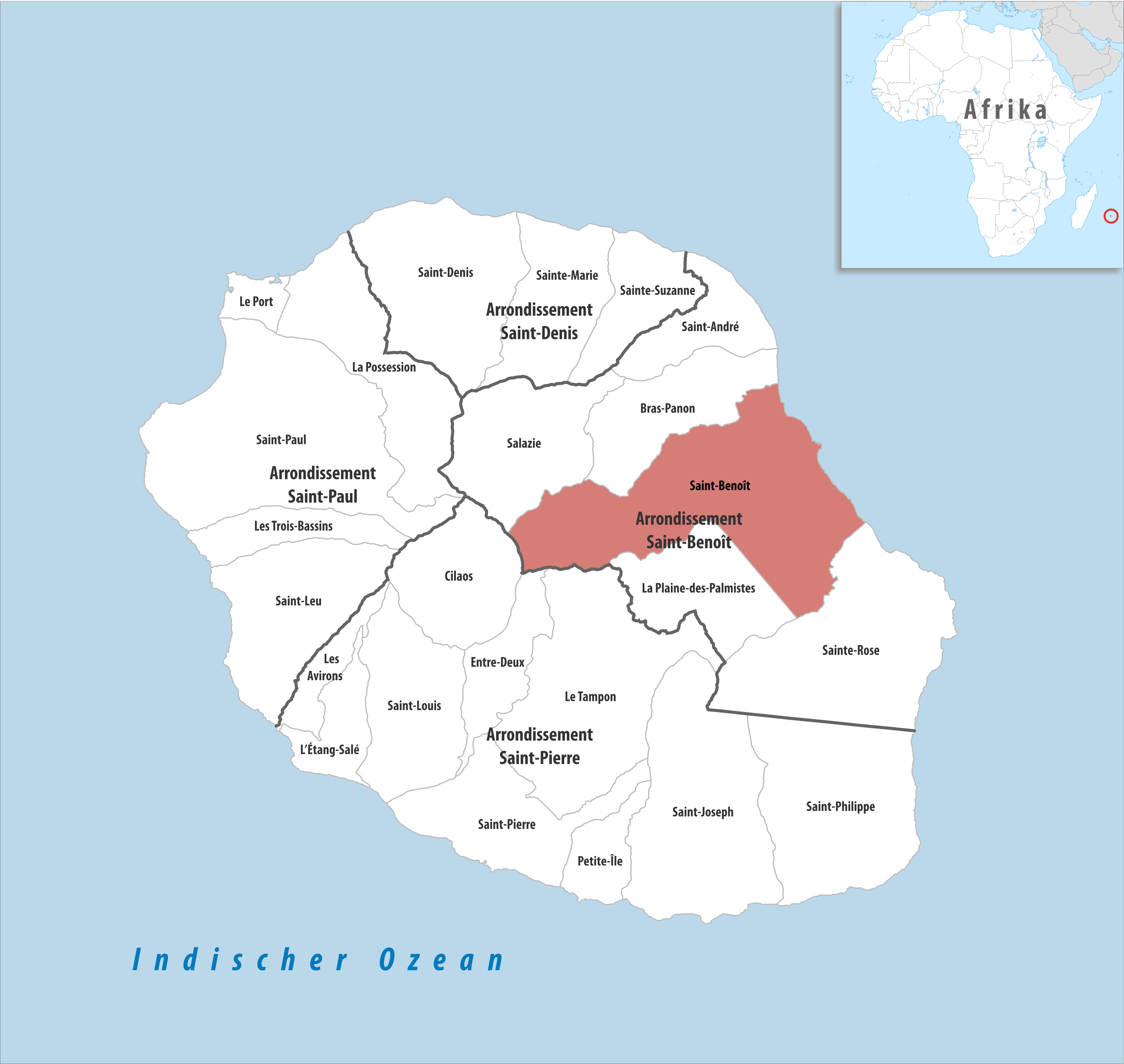
- Location of Saint-Benoît
- Coordinates: 21°02′02″S 55°42′46″E
- Country: France
- Overseas region and department: Réunion
- Arrondissement: Saint-Benoît
- Canton: Saint-Benoît-1 and 2
- Intercommunality: Réunion Est

Government
  - Mayor (2020–2026): Patrice Selly
- Area^{1}: 229.61 km^{2} (88.65 sq mi)
- Elevation: 7 m (23 ft)
- Highest elevation: 2,520 m (8,270 ft)
- Lowest elevation: 0 m (0 ft)
- Population (2023): 38,604
  - Density: 168.13/km^{2} (435.45/sq mi)
- Time zone: UTC+04:00
- INSEE/Postal code: 97410 /97470
- ^{1} French Land Register data, which excludes lakes, ponds, glaciers > 1 km^{2} (0.386 sq mi or 247 acres) and river estuaries.

Saint-Benoît (French pronunciation: [sɛ̃ bənwa]) is a commune in the French overseas department of Réunion, in the Indian Ocean. It is located on the eastern part of the island of Réunion, about 40 kilometres southeast of Saint-Denis, the capital.

== History ==
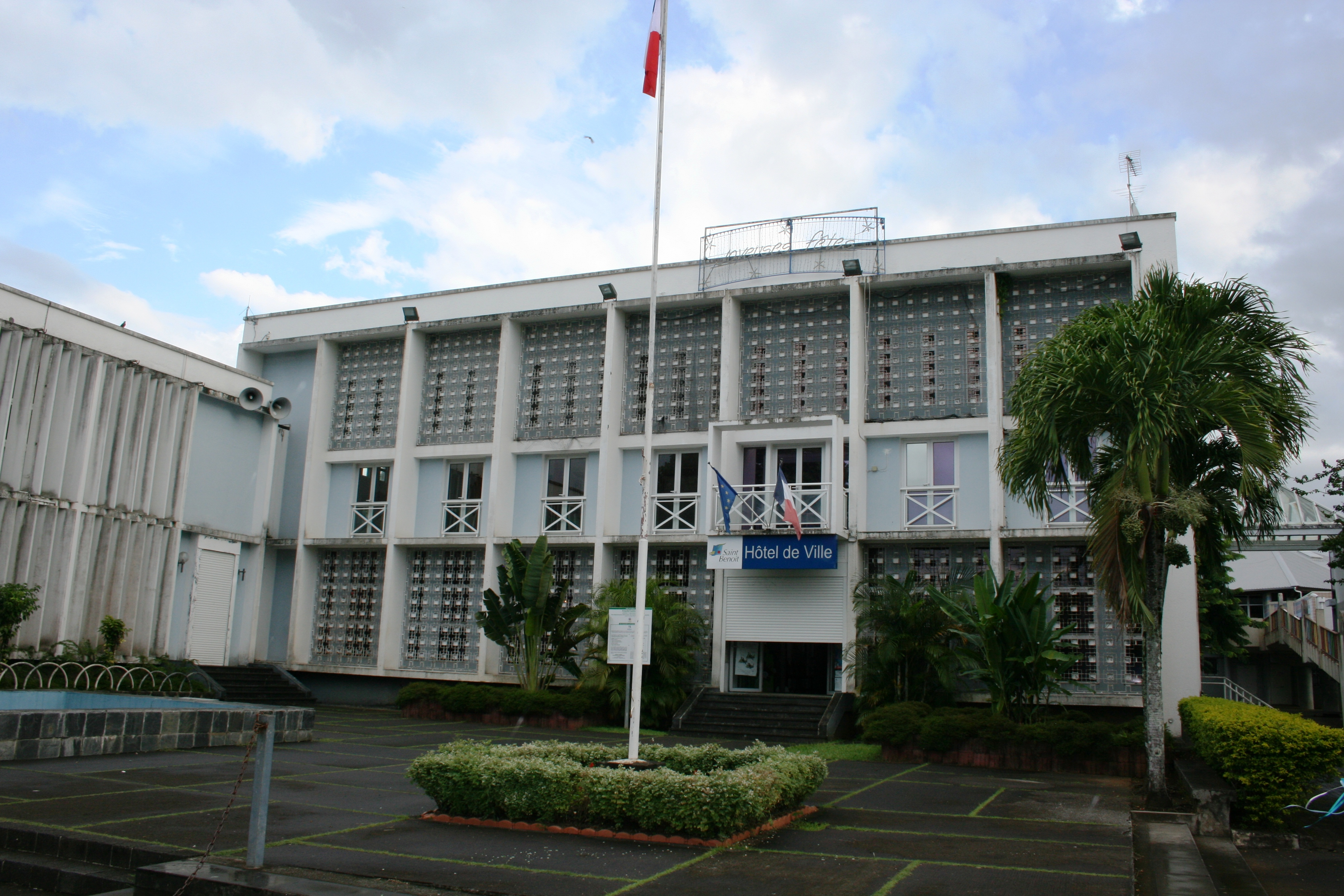
The Hôtel de Ville

The Hôtel de Ville was completed in 1966.

== Geography ==
It is the second largest city of the island by its surface area. In the west of the commune lies Grand Étang, the largest lake of La Réunion. Close to the lake flows the Bras d'Annette waterfall.

=== Climate ===
Saint-Benoît has a tropical rainforest climate (Köppen climate classification Af). The climate is tropical, influenced by the winds called alizés, or trade winds. The average annual temperature in Saint-Benoît is 23.8 °C (74.8 °F). The average annual rainfall is 3,455.9 mm (136.06 in) with February as the wettest month. The temperatures are highest on average in February, at around 26.5 °C (79.7 °F), and lowest in July, at around 21.0 °C (69.8 °F). The highest temperature ever recorded in Saint-Benoît was 34.1 °C (93.4 °F) on 6 February 2004; the coldest temperature ever recorded was 10.5 °C (50.9 °F) on 15 July 1991.

Climate data for Saint-Benoît (1991–2020 averages, extremes 1987−present)
Month	Jan	Feb	Mar	Apr	May	Jun	Jul	Aug	Sep	Oct	Nov	Dec	Year
Record high °C (°F)	33.7 (92.7)	34.1 (93.4)	33.9 (93.0)	33.4 (92.1)	32.0 (89.6)	31.8 (89.2)	30.0 (86.0)	29.7 (85.5)	29.7 (85.5)	30.1 (86.2)	33.8 (92.8)	33.6 (92.5)	34.1 (93.4)
Mean daily maximum °C (°F)	30.2 (86.4)	30.5 (86.9)	30.1 (86.2)	29.3 (84.7)	27.7 (81.9)	26.0 (78.8)	25.0 (77.0)	25.2 (77.4)	25.7 (78.3)	26.6 (79.9)	27.8 (82.0)	29.3 (84.7)	27.8 (82.0)
Daily mean °C (°F)	26.3 (79.3)	26.5 (79.7)	26.1 (79.0)	25.2 (77.4)	23.6 (74.5)	21.9 (71.4)	21.0 (69.8)	21.2 (70.2)	21.7 (71.1)	22.7 (72.9)	23.8 (74.8)	25.3 (77.5)	23.8 (74.8)
Mean daily minimum °C (°F)	22.3 (72.1)	22.5 (72.5)	22.0 (71.6)	21.1 (70.0)	19.5 (67.1)	17.8 (64.0)	17.0 (62.6)	17.1 (62.8)	17.7 (63.9)	18.7 (65.7)	19.9 (67.8)	21.4 (70.5)	19.7 (67.5)
Record low °C (°F)	17.4 (63.3)	17.2 (63.0)	17.6 (63.7)	15.8 (60.4)	13.3 (55.9)	12.1 (53.8)	10.5 (50.9)	11.4 (52.5)	12.0 (53.6)	12.8 (55.0)	13.7 (56.7)	16.9 (62.4)	10.5 (50.9)
Average precipitation mm (inches)	469.1 (18.47)	541.0 (21.30)	535.2 (21.07)	349.4 (13.76)	260.1 (10.24)	179.2 (7.06)	178.6 (7.03)	154.6 (6.09)	144.8 (5.70)	132.6 (5.22)	181.3 (7.14)	330.0 (12.99)	3,455.9 (136.06)
Average precipitation days (≥ 1.0 mm)	19.9	18.3	19.2	17.6	17.0	14.7	17.0	16.6	14.5	13.4	12.8	16.8	197.7
Source: Météo France

== Population ==
Historical population
Year	Pop.	±% p.a.
1961	16,783	—
1967	19,492	+2.53%
1974	21,658	+1.52%
1982	23,541	+1.05%
1990	26,187	+1.34%
1999	31,560	+2.10%
2007	33,485	+0.74%
2012	36,025	+1.47%
2017	37,759	+0.94%
2023	38,604	+0.37%
Source: SPLAF and INSEE (1967-2023)

== See also ==
- Communes of the Réunion department
