= Rivière des Marsouins =

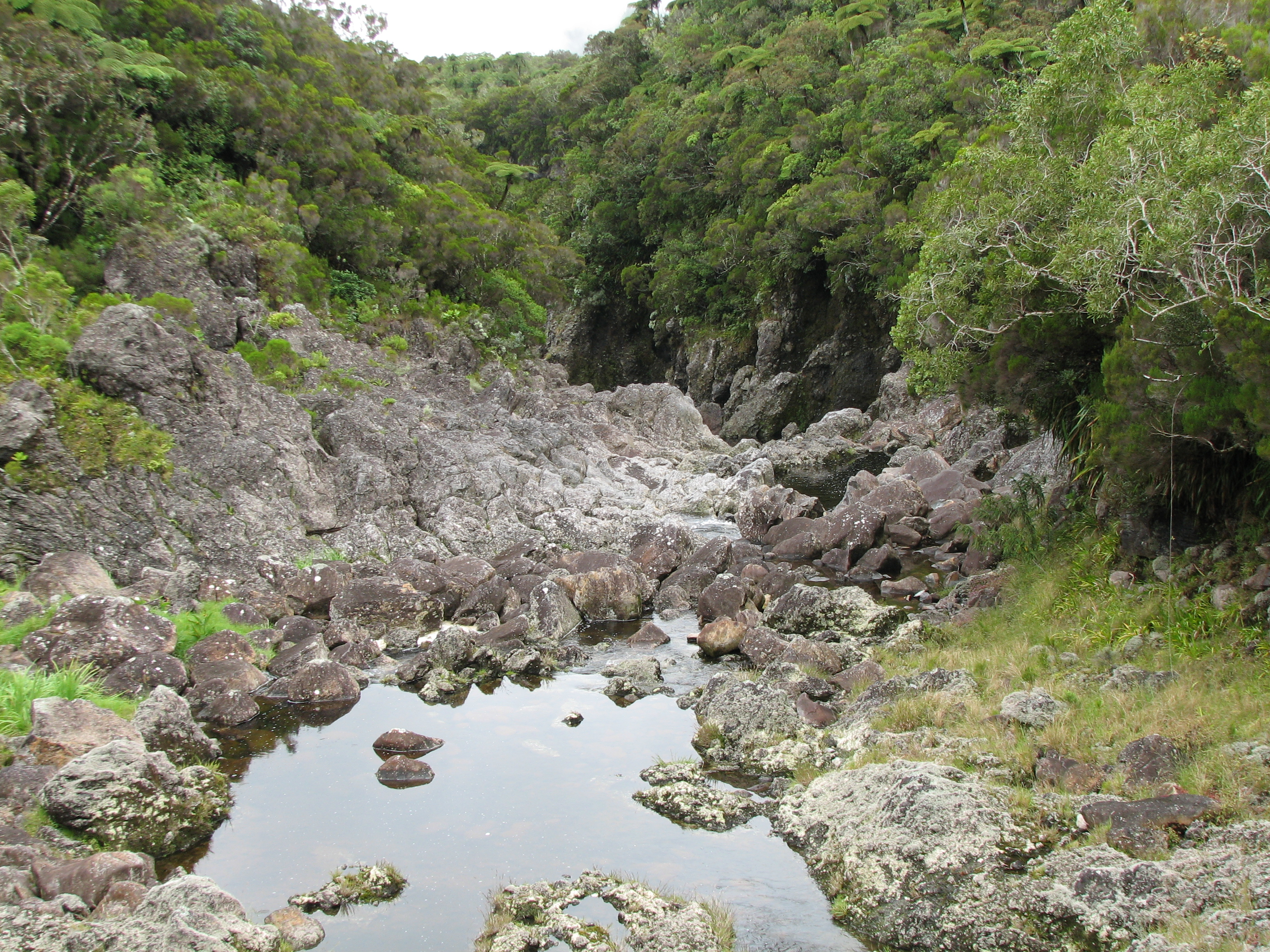

Location
- Country: France
- Region: Réunion

Physical characteristics
- Mouth: Indian Ocean
  - coordinates: 21°1′51″S 55°42′57″E
- Length: 32.3 km (20.1 mi)

The Rivière des Marsouins is a river on the Indian Ocean island of Réunion, which is an overseas department and region of France. The river is 32.3 km (20.1 mi) long. It flows northeast from the center of the island, reaching the sea close to the town of Saint-Benoit. The Rivière des Roches follows a largely parallel course, reaching the sea three kilometres to the north.
