= 2018–19 South-West Indian Ocean cyclone season =

Cyclone season in the Southwest Indian Ocean

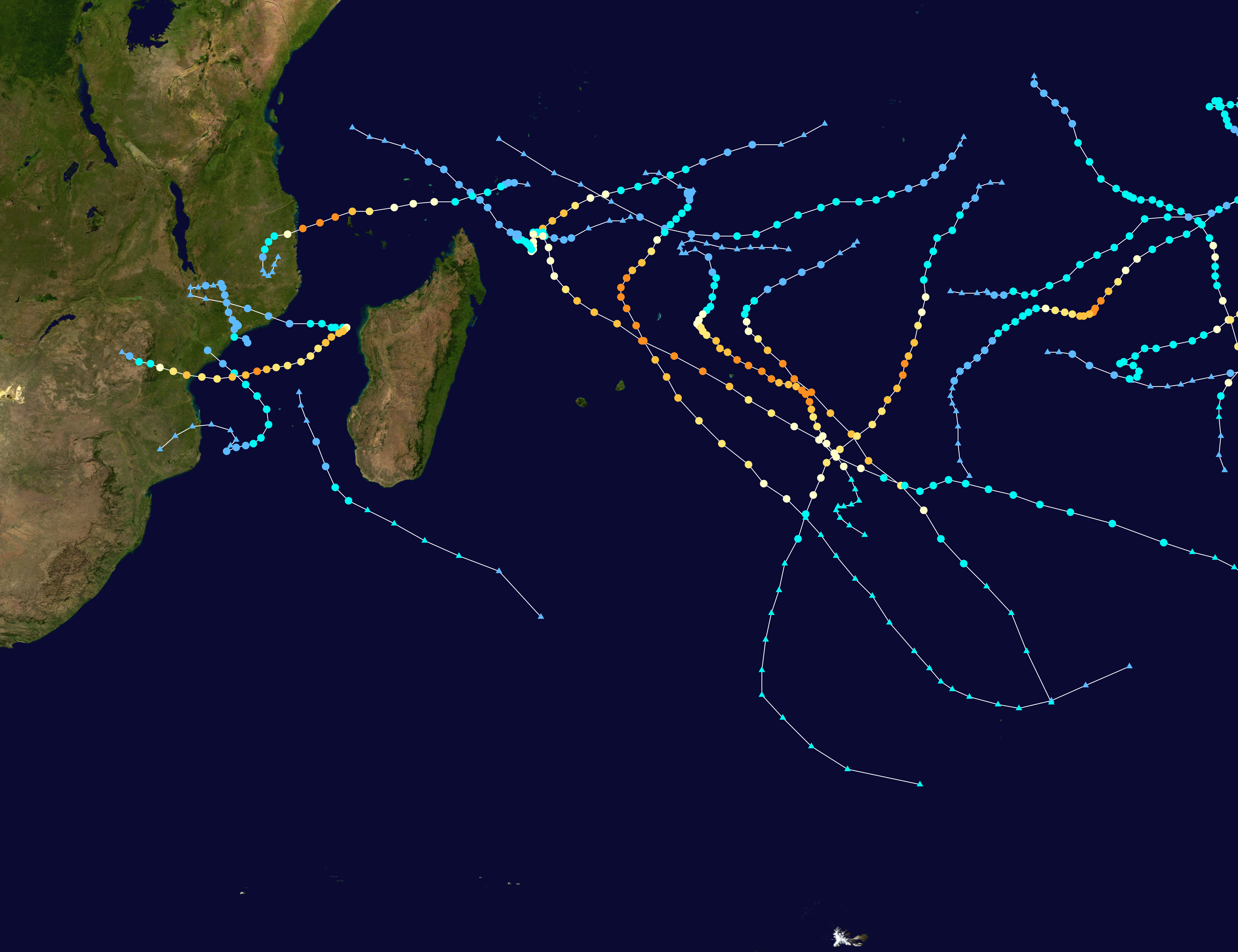
- Season summary map

Seasonal boundaries
- First system formed: 14 September 2018
- Last system dissipated: 29 April 2019

Strongest storm
- Name: Kenneth
  - Maximum winds: 215 km/h (130 mph) (10-minute sustained)
  - Lowest pressure: 930 hPa (mbar)

Seasonal statistics
- Total disturbances: 15
- Total depressions: 15
- Total storms: 15 (record high)
- Tropical cyclones: 11 (record high)
- Intense tropical cyclones: 9 (record high)
- Very intense tropical cyclones: 0
- Total fatalities: 1,675 total (Deadliest South-West Indian Ocean cyclone season and also deadliest cyclone season in the Southern Hemisphere on record)
- Total damage: ≥ $3.65 billion (2019 USD) (Second costliest South-West Indian Ocean cyclone season on record)

Related articles
- 2018–19 Australian region cyclone season; 2018–19 South Pacific cyclone season

The 2018–19 South-West Indian Ocean cyclone season was a record breaking and devastating season that was the most active season ever recorded in the basin. It was the deadliest cyclone season recorded in the South-West Indian Ocean, surpassing the 1891–92 season in which the 1892 Mauritius cyclone devastated the island of Mauritius, and was the costliest South-West Indian Ocean season at the time until it was surpassed by the 2024-25 season. Most of the fatalities and damage came from Cyclone Idai. The season was an event of the annual cycle of tropical cyclone and subtropical cyclone formation in the South-West Indian Ocean basin. It officially began on 15 November 2018, and ended on 30 April 2019, except for Mauritius and the Seychelles, which it ended on 15 May 2019. These dates conventionally delimit the period of each year when most tropical and subtropical cyclones form in the basin, which is west of 90°E and south of the Equator. Tropical and subtropical cyclones in this basin are monitored by the Regional Specialised Meteorological Centre in Réunion.

The season set a new record of nine intense tropical cyclones, the largest number since the start of reliable satellite coverage in 1967, surpassing the 2006–07 season. Beginning the season early, Moderate Tropical Storm 01 formed during September 2018. Two other systems formed prior to the official start of the season during November—the first intense tropical cyclone and the first named storm, Alcide, and Severe Tropical Storm Bouchra. A pair of intense tropical cyclones—Cilida and Kenanga—persisted in December. In January 2019, Desmond caused damages in Mozambique, and shortly thereafter, Eketsang passed by Madagascar, producing heavy rain and landslides that killed 27. Onto the next month, Funani and Gelena threatened Rodrigues, with the latter disrupting its electricity and causing US$1 million in damages.

The most active and destructive month was March. Haleh remained near the centre of the basin, bringing no impact. Cyclone Idai made two landfalls in Mozambique as a tropical depression and intense tropical cyclone, causing at least 1,593 deaths and leaving at least 2,262 people missing, and causing US$3.3 billion in damages in Mozambique, Zimbabwe, Malawi, and Madagascar. Savannah entered the basin in the middle of the month. Joaninha became the second cyclone of 2019 to strike Rodrigues, destroying the island's power grid. In April, Kenneth became the strongest storm of the season, with maximum sustained winds of 215 km/h (130 mph); the storm killed at least 7 people in Comoros and made landfall in Mozambique, causing at least 45 deaths and overall damage of US$345 million. Lorna remained over the eastern portion of the basin, concluding the season after it dissipated on 29 April.

== Seasonal forecasts ==
On 24 October 2018, the Mauritius Meteorological Services (MMS) released their summer 2018–19 outlook. The agency expected a slightly below to near-average season, predicting that 7 to 9 tropical cyclones would form. In addition, the MMS indicated that conditions in the central tropical Indian Ocean and between Diego Garcia and Agaléga, or west of the 70th meridian east, would be more conducive for tropical cyclogenesis. Also in October, the Indian Ocean Commission and the European Centre for Medium-Range Weather Forecasts (ECMWF) forecasted a near-average season. ECMWF gave an index of 8.1 systems before revising it the next month to 7.3.

Météo-France (MFR) announced their seasonal forecast of tropical cyclone activity on 15 November, after the formation of 01, Alcide, and Bouchra, comparing the sudden start to the 1996–97 season. Despite this, the MFR forecasted a nearly-average season, citing the conditions of an El Niño event. Compared to an average of ten moderate tropical storms that usually form in the South-West Indian Ocean, MFR expected that 8 to 11 systems would form, with 4 to 6 of them reaching the tropical cyclone stage. A 20% chance was given to the probability of below-average activity, a 60% chance was given to near-average activity, and a 20% chance was given to above-average activity. The agency indicated that cyclogenesis would mainly occur over the central Indian Ocean and western portion of the basin. MFR also predicted that the motion of cyclones during the season would have a stronger meridional component than normal, having a tendency to track south quickly.

The forecasts from the MFR failed to predict enhanced activity over the Mozambique Channel and hypothesised that most of the energy for cyclone formation was caused by strong equatorial waves activity. For future operations, MFR planned to target inhabited areas.

== Seasonal summary ==
ECHO daily map of the basin after the season (01 and Eketsang do not appear in this graphic)

The 2018–19 South-West Indian Ocean cyclone season officially ran from 15 November 2018 to 30 April 2019, with the exception for the island nations of Mauritius and Seychelles, which ended on 15 May 2019. The season was the second costliest, deadliest, and most active since reliable records began in 1967. Collectively, the systems caused 1,675 deaths and about $3.65 billion in damage, and is mainly attributed to Cyclone Idai, which caused 1,593 deaths and $3.3 billion in damages. Throughout the season, 15 tropical disturbances formed, all of which reached the moderate tropical storm stage. Eleven of these storms attained tropical cyclone status, and all but two—Savannah and Lorna—reached the intense tropical cyclone stage, breaking the previous record of having the most intense tropical cyclones held by the 2006–07 season, which had six. Regardless of the activity, there were no systems in this season that acquired the strength of a very intense tropical cyclone—the highest classification in MFR's intensity scale.

Météo-France's meteorological office in Réunion (MFR) – the official Regional Specialised Meteorological Centre for the South-West Indian Ocean – tracked all tropical cyclones from the east coast of Africa to 90° E, and south of the equator. Regional warning centres in Mauritius and Madagascar formally named the individual storms. The Joint Typhoon Warning Center (JTWC), which is a joint United States Navy – United States Air Force task force that issues tropical cyclone warnings for the region, also issued advisories for storms during the season.

=== Pre/early season activity ===
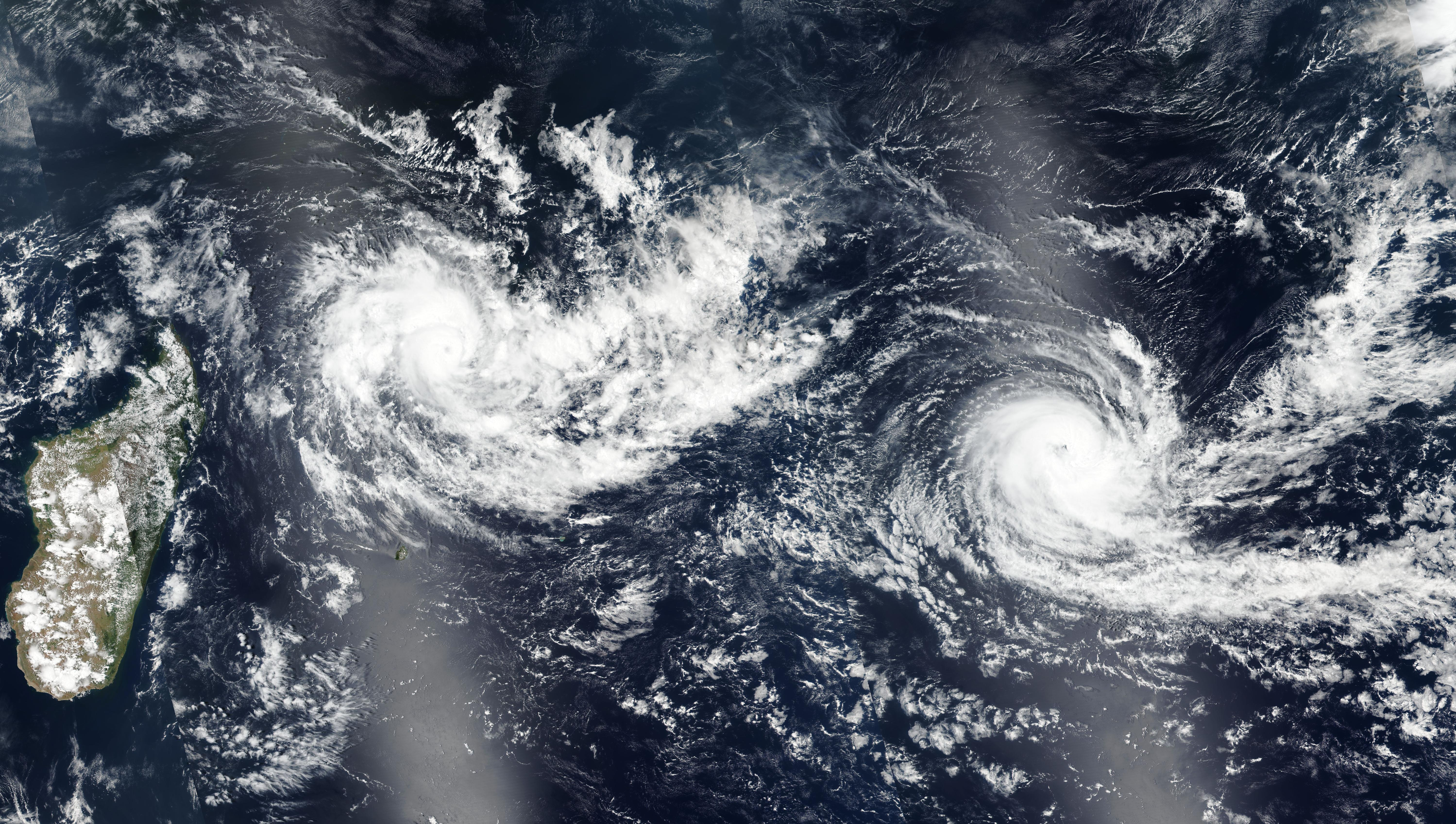
Tropical Cyclones Cilida (left) and Kenanga (right) on 20 December 2018

The season abruptly began with the formation of Moderate Tropical Storm 01 on 14 September 2018. After two months of inactivity, a tropical disturbance formed. This system developed into a tropical depression and then to a tropical cyclone on 7 November, receiving the name Alcide. After affecting the dependency of Agaléga, the storm steered northwestward, and concurrently, a tropical disturbance at the eastern border of the basin formed on 9 November. As Alcide dissipated on 11 November, with its remnants last noted on 14 November, the embryonic system oscillated around the 90th meridian east for several days. The disturbance intensified into Severe Tropical Storm Bouchra during the period, and eventually stayed within the basin on 17 November, before dissipating on 20 November.

Two storms emerged in the month of December: Kenanga and Cilida. The former entered the basin from the Australian region on 16 December, whereas the latter developed from the monsoon trough to a tropical depression two days later. Kenanga attained intense tropical cyclone status on 18 December, as Cilida headed towards Mauritius. Simultaneously on 20 December, both storms were tropical cyclones within the basin, the first such case since the 2013–14 season. Also peaking as an intense tropical cyclone, Cilida brought slight impact towards Mauritius. Both storms then weaken and had dissipated by 24 December.

=== Peak to late activity ===
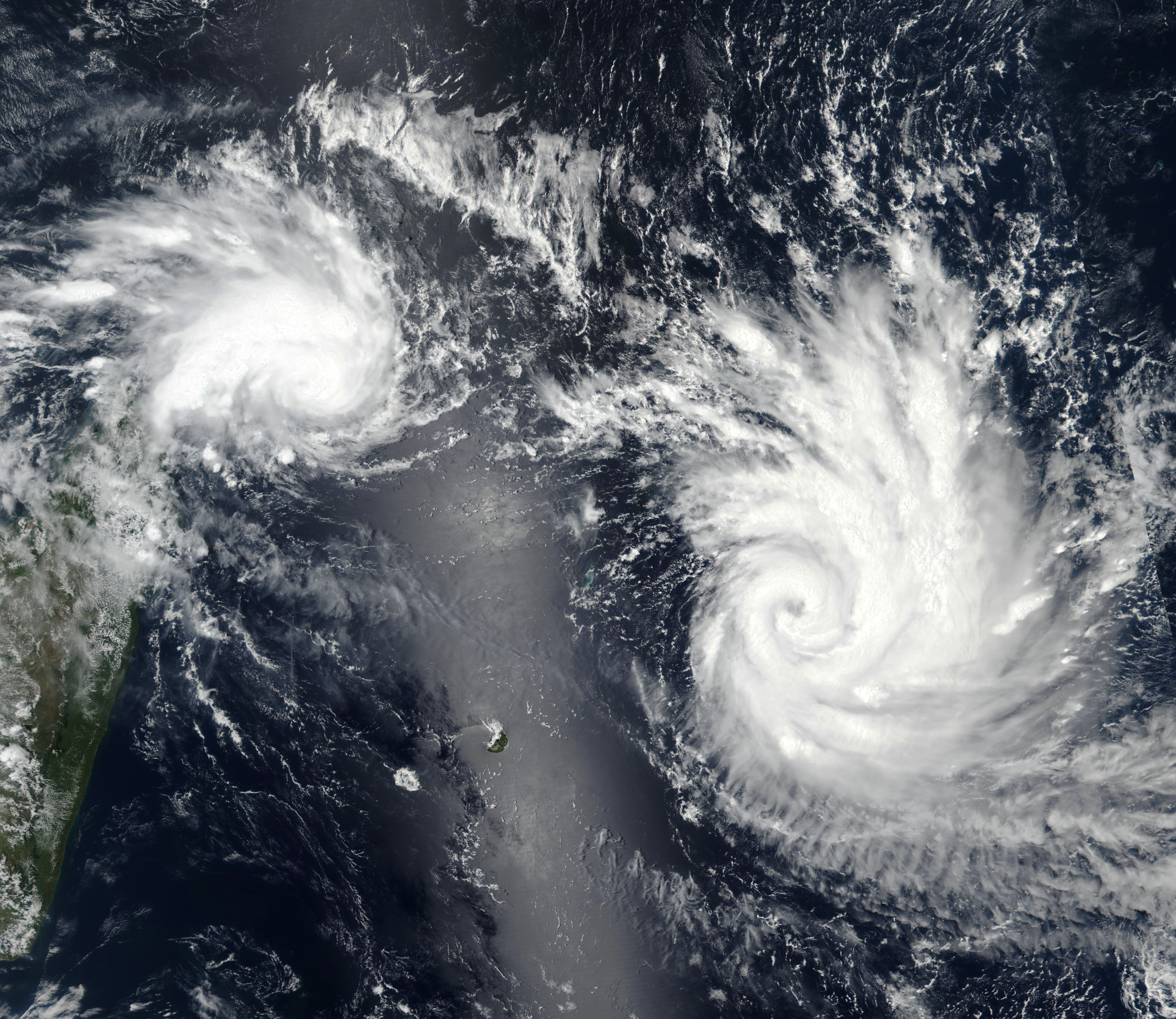
Funani (right) and Gelena (left) on 6 February 2019

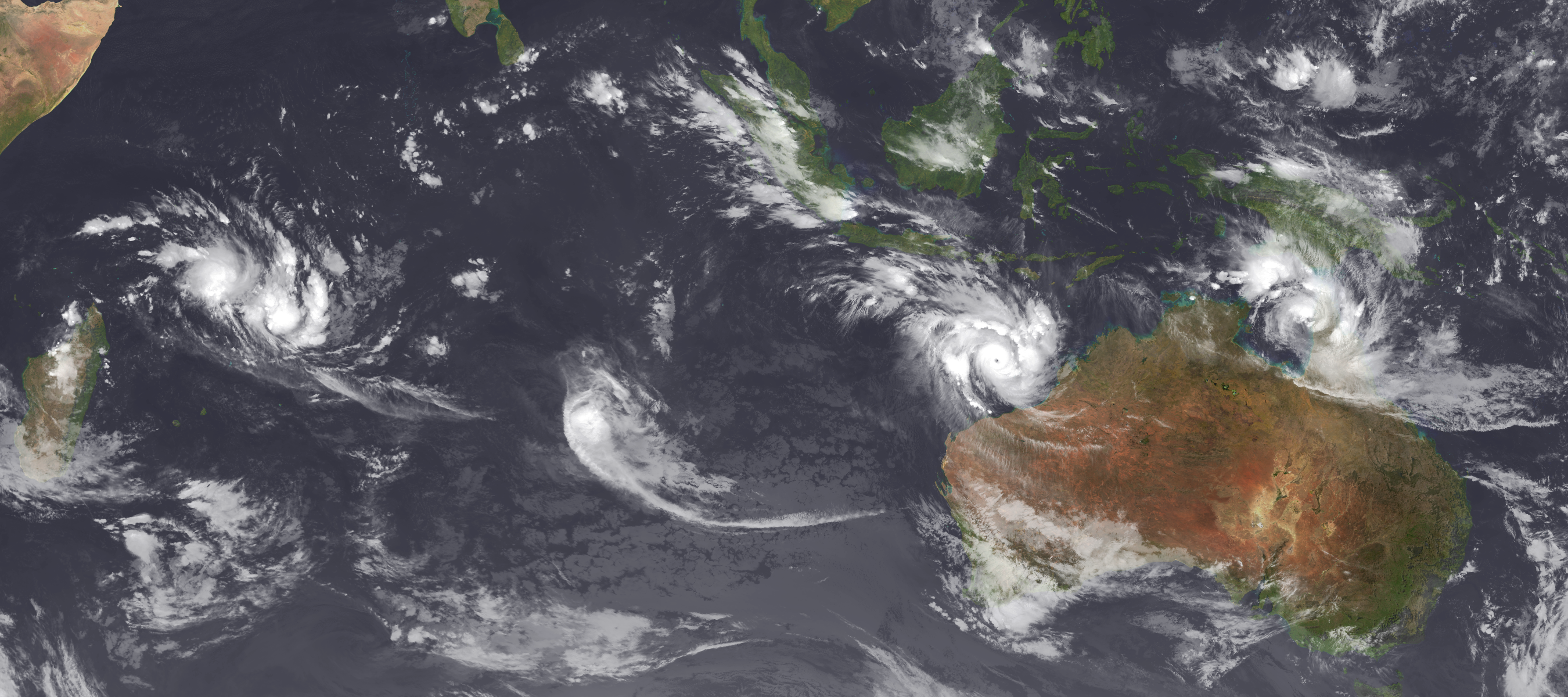
Joaninha and Savannah's remnants, along with Cyclones Veronica and Trevor in the Australian basin on 21 March

After a pause in activity, the formation of Moderate Tropical Storm Desmond occurred over the Mozambique Channel on 18 January. The storm tracked westward and then recurved towards Mozambique and struck the country, before quickly dissipating overland on 22 January. Another storm formed a day after within the same area as the previous. This system developed into Moderate Tropical Storm Eketsang on 24 January and passed southeast of Madagascar, bringing heavy rains and landslides. In February, a second pair of tropical cyclones occurred during the season, being Funani and Gelena. Both storms peaked as intense tropical cyclones and passed near the island of Rodrigues, before each dissipated on 9 and 14 February respectively.

On 1 March, Intense Tropical Cyclone Haleh formed out of an active phase of the Madden–Julian oscillation combined with equatorial waves, generally moving south-southwestward and causing no impact towards land. On 4 March, Idai—the deadliest and second costliest tropical cyclone of the South-West Indian Ocean—formed as a tropical depression. Making landfall in Mozambique, the system stayed overland for several days, eventually traversing the Mozambique Channel. The storm rapidly intensified and made a second landfall in Mozambique as an intense tropical cyclone, before quickly dissipating on 15 March. On 18 March, Severe Tropical Cyclone Savannah from the Australian region entered the basin; it rapidly weakened from wind shear, dissipating on 19 March. Joaninha followed, forming on 21 March and becoming a tropical storm later that day. The storm developed and peaked two times as an intense tropical cyclone on 25 and 27 March, being near Rodrigues in the meantime, and dissipated three days later.

The last two systems, Kenneth and Lorna, formed at the same time during April. Kenneth generally tracked westward towards Mozambique, making landfall on 25 April, becoming the second intense tropical cyclone of the season to do so. In addition, with 1-minute sustained winds of 220 km/h (135 mph), Kenneth was the most powerful storm to strike the country on record. Meanwhile, over the eastern half of the basin, Lorna moved southeastward, peaking as a tropical cyclone on 28 April, and dissipated on 29 April without affecting land.

== Systems ==
=== Moderate Tropical Storm 01 ===
- Moderate tropical storm (MFR)
- Tropical storm (SSHWS)
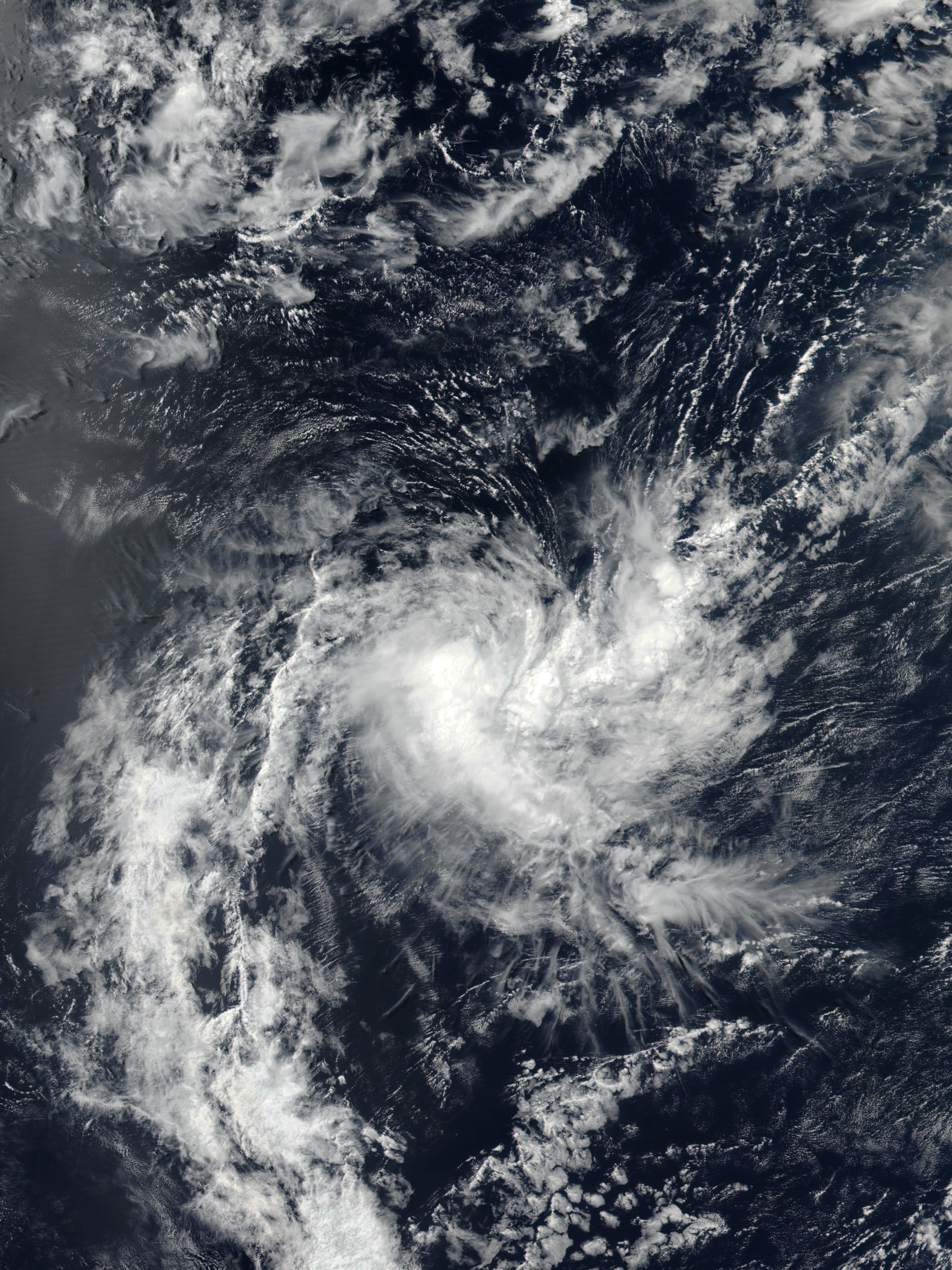
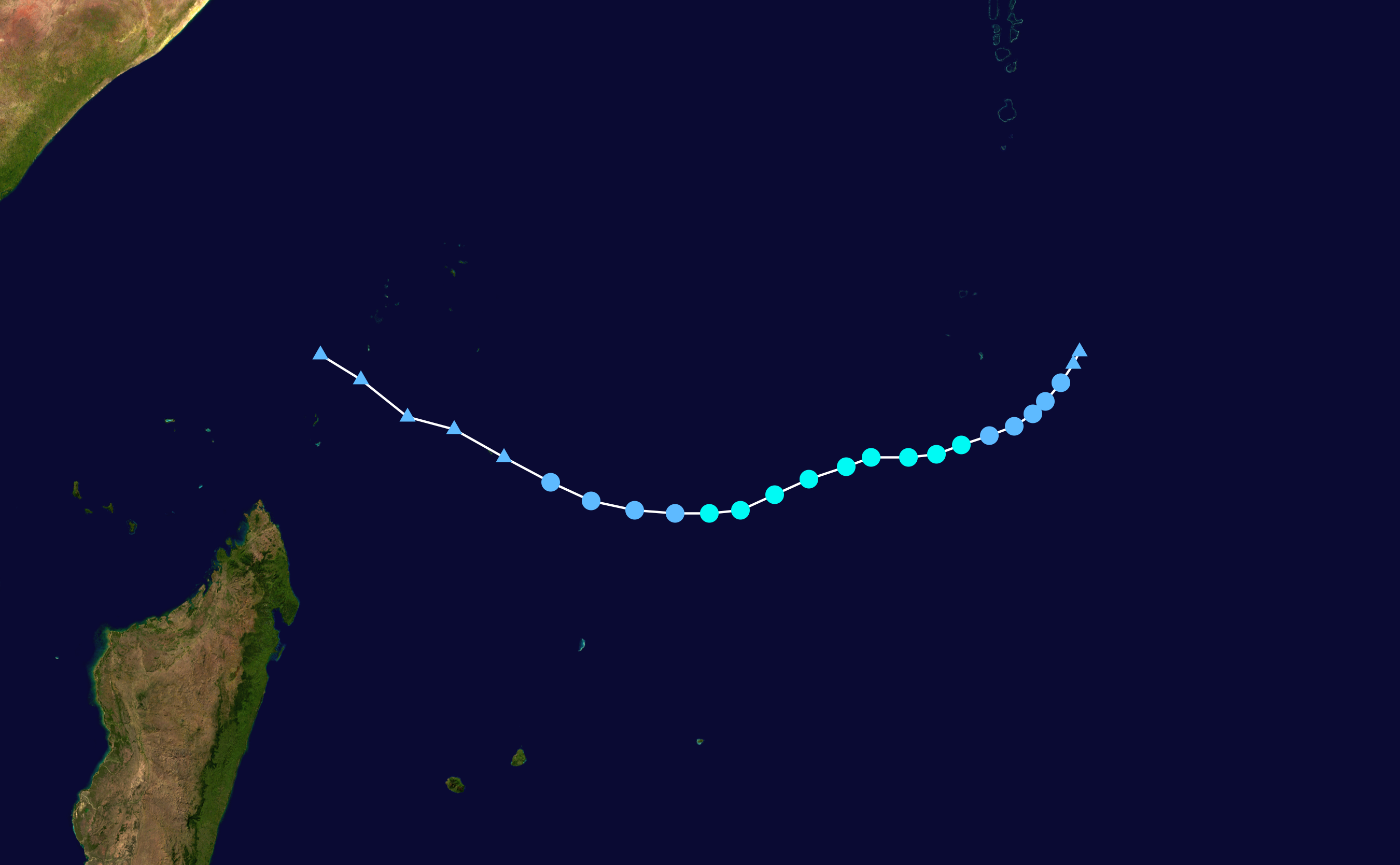
- Duration: 14 September – 17 September
- Peak intensity: 75 km/h (45 mph) (10-min); 995 hPa (mbar)

Within the Intertropical Convergence Zone (ITCZ), an equatorial Rossby wave led to the formation of a weak cyclonic circulation near 7°S 75°E on 13 September, with intense convection, or thunderstorms, fluctuating in the system. A Kelvin wave and the subtropical jet sustained the system, but it was forecasted that it would not undergo deepening and will fill up. East of the Chagos Archipelago, the system consolidated into a tropical disturbance on 14 September, retaining a well-defined centre, accommodated by sufficient ocean heat content. Moving southwestward, it began possessing nascent rainbands. Despite low vertical wind shear and improving poleward outflow, marginal sea surface temperatures of 26 °C (79 °F) limited development of the compact disturbance. The MFR upgraded the disturbance to a tropical depression later that day. Operationally, the system peaked as a tropical depression, but was upgraded by the MFR to a moderate tropical storm after post-season analysis, though the cyclone remained unnamed. The storm then begin to track over a hostile environment of moderate wind shear, dry air entrainment in the mid-level troposphere, and cooler waters. Turning westward, the storm failed to organise its deep convection, leading to its centre becoming exposed, albeit still being defined. It weakened into a low at 12:00 UTC, before dissipating two days later at 06:00 UTC.

=== Intense Tropical Cyclone Alcide ===
- Intense tropical cyclone (MFR)
- Category 4 tropical cyclone (SSHWS)
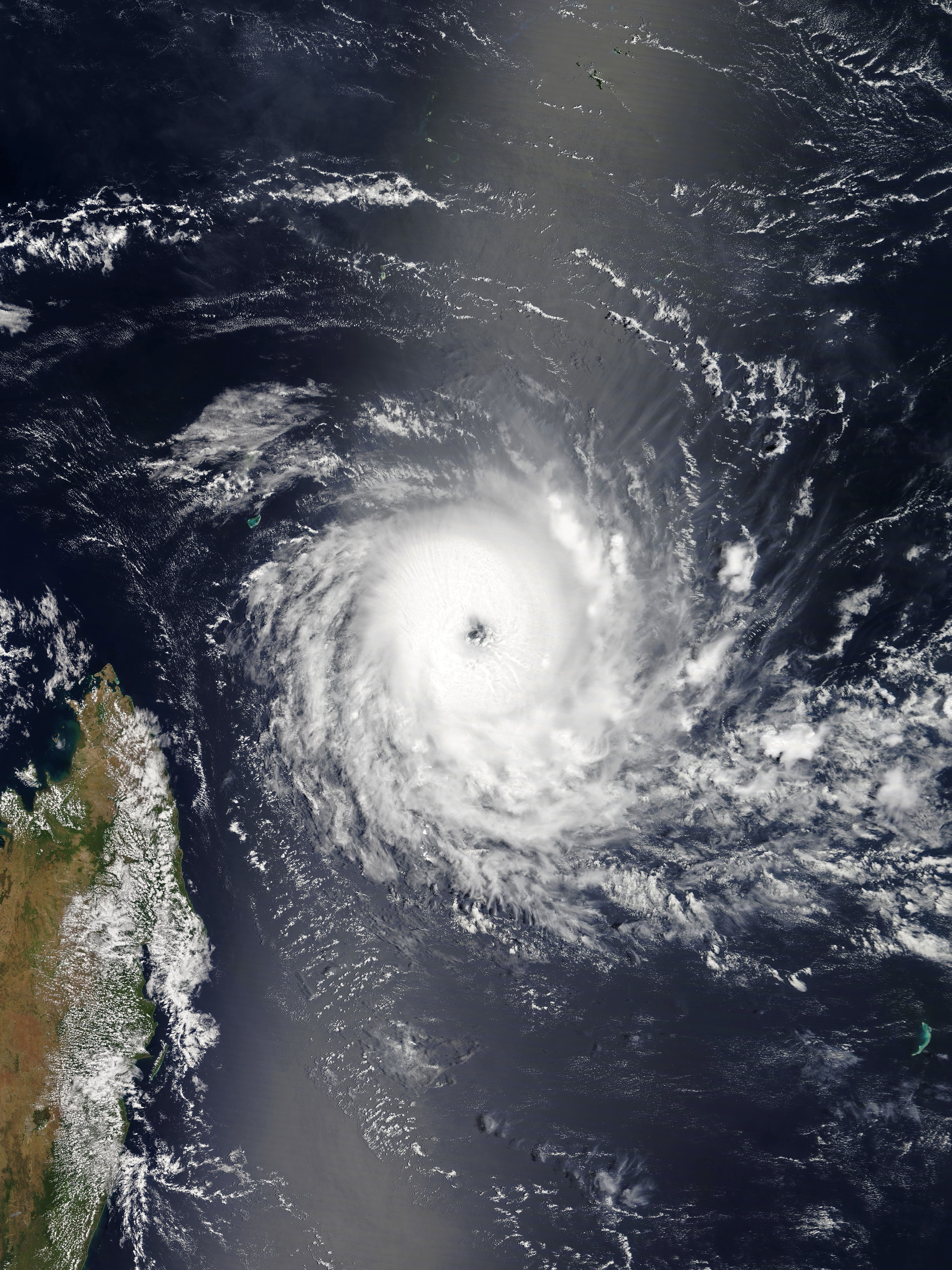
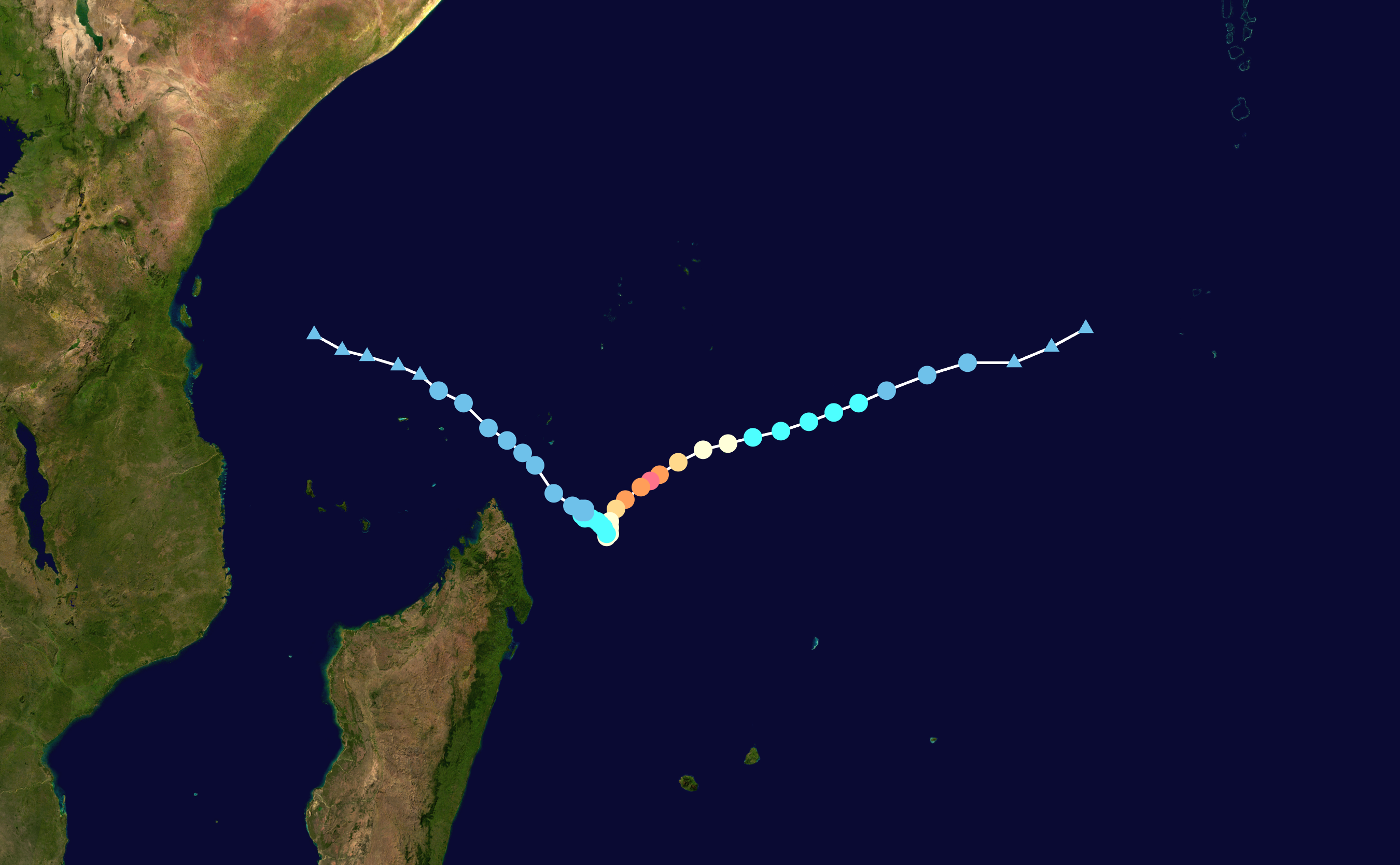
- Duration: 6 November – 11 November
- Peak intensity: 185 km/h (115 mph) (10-min); 960 hPa (mbar)

In early-November, low-level vorticity inside the ITCZ indicated the possibility of tropical cyclogenesis between the Chagos Archipelago and Seychelles. The arrival of an active phase of the Madden–Julian oscillation (MJO) boosted this potential, giving a high likelihood of a tropical storm within the next five days. Eventually on 6 November, a tropical disturbance formed after convection organised around a surface circulation over the previous day. Initially inhibited by dry air intrusion, the system intensified into a tropical depression, moving west-southwest along a ridge to the southeast, following strong bursts of convection over the centre. Convective cloud tops of −90 °C (−130 °F) signaled an improvement in the centre; as such, the system was upgraded to a moderate tropical storm, receiving the name Alcide from the Mauritius Meteorological Services (MMS). Alcide then became the first severe tropical storm of the season on 7 November. While attaining Category 1 strength on the Saffir–Simpson scale (SSHWS), Alcide presented a 28-kilometre-wide (17 mi) ragged eye, as convective bands tightened into the core. Alcide was upgraded to a tropical cyclone at 06:00 UTC, with its eye hovering over Agaléga.

Benefiting from strong poleward outflow, the symmetrical cyclone quickly intensified into a Category 3-equivalent tropical cyclone on 8 November. At 03:00 UTC, 1-minute winds were estimated to be 215 km/h (130 mph)—equivalent to a Category 4 hurricane. The MFR also upgraded Alcide to an intense tropical cyclone, as the storm peaked with 10-minute winds of 185 km/h (115 mph). Likewise to the previous system, Alcide was characterised as a small cyclone. The eye then became cloud-filled, progressively becoming ragged and disorganised. By 18:00 UTC, Alcide was no longer an intense tropical cyclone. Cloud tops warmed around the centre, obscured by a layer of cirrus clouds. With no steering flow, Alcide was nearly stationary, as dry air intrude the inner core. Consequently, upwelling prevailed as outflow diminished, weakening convection. On 9 November, Alcide was downgraded to a severe tropical storm. On the next day, the JTWC assessed Alcide's winds as being tropical storm-force. Alcide began turning northwestward, though the cloud pattern significantly decayed and deep convection had collapsed in the eastern quadrant. By 11 November, the MFR categorised Alcide as a tropical depression, citing the lack of deep convection and exposal of the circulation. The storm disintegrated into a remnant low on 12 November, before dissipating on 14 November.

While Alcide approached the archipelago of Agaléga, 75 residents evacuated from South Island to a refuge centre in North Island. On 7 November, Alcide made its closest approach to Agaléga, with wind gusts of 110 km/h (68 mph) recorded by a weather station. At the time, 45 people sought shelter centres, as many trees were down and electricity and water distribution was disrupted. As a result, several homes were left without power. Many houses were damaged and a 15-year-old girl was injured in addition. After the storm had passed, metal roofs of around thirty homes awaited repairment.

=== Severe Tropical Storm Bouchra ===
- Severe tropical storm (MFR)
- Tropical storm (SSHWS)
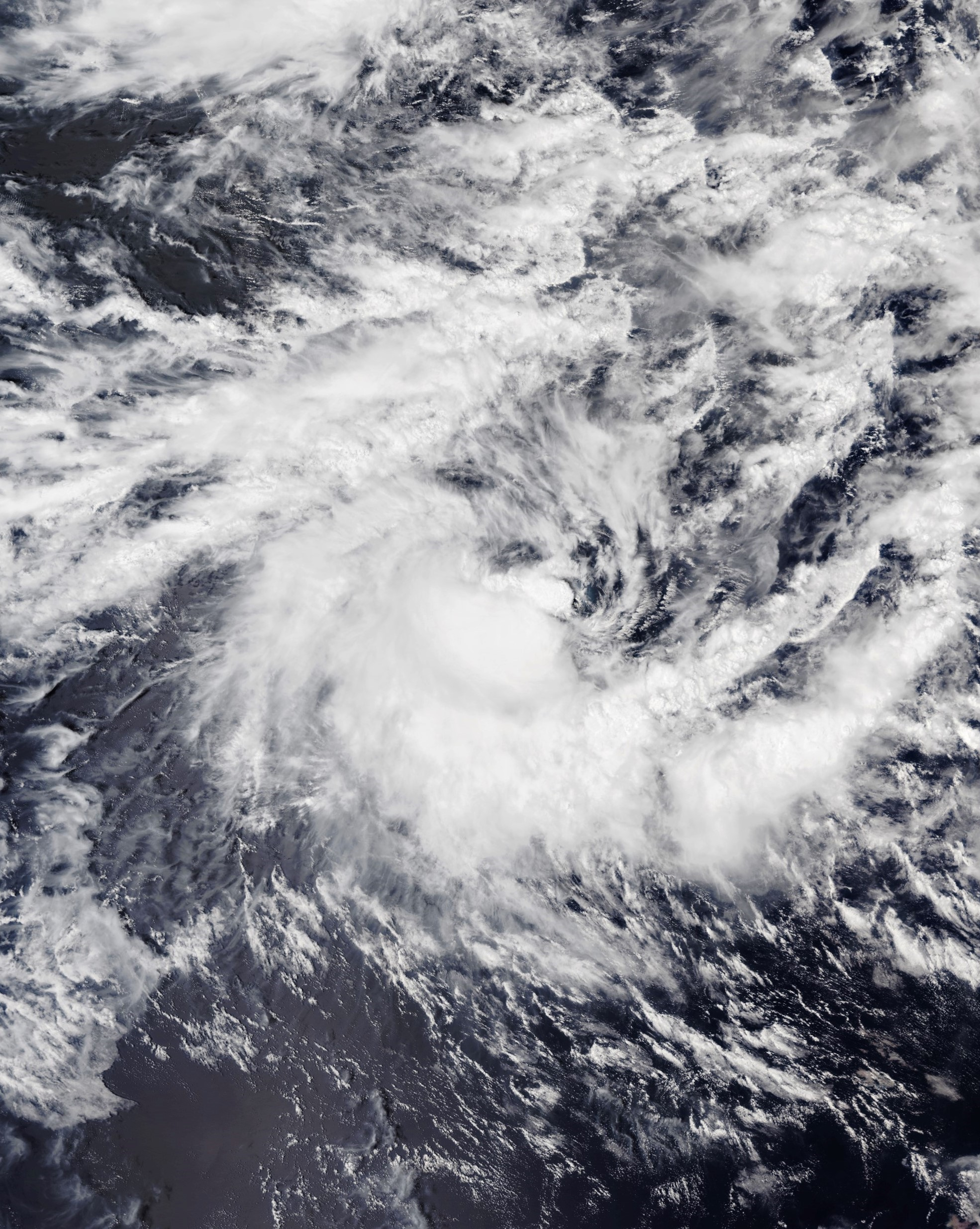
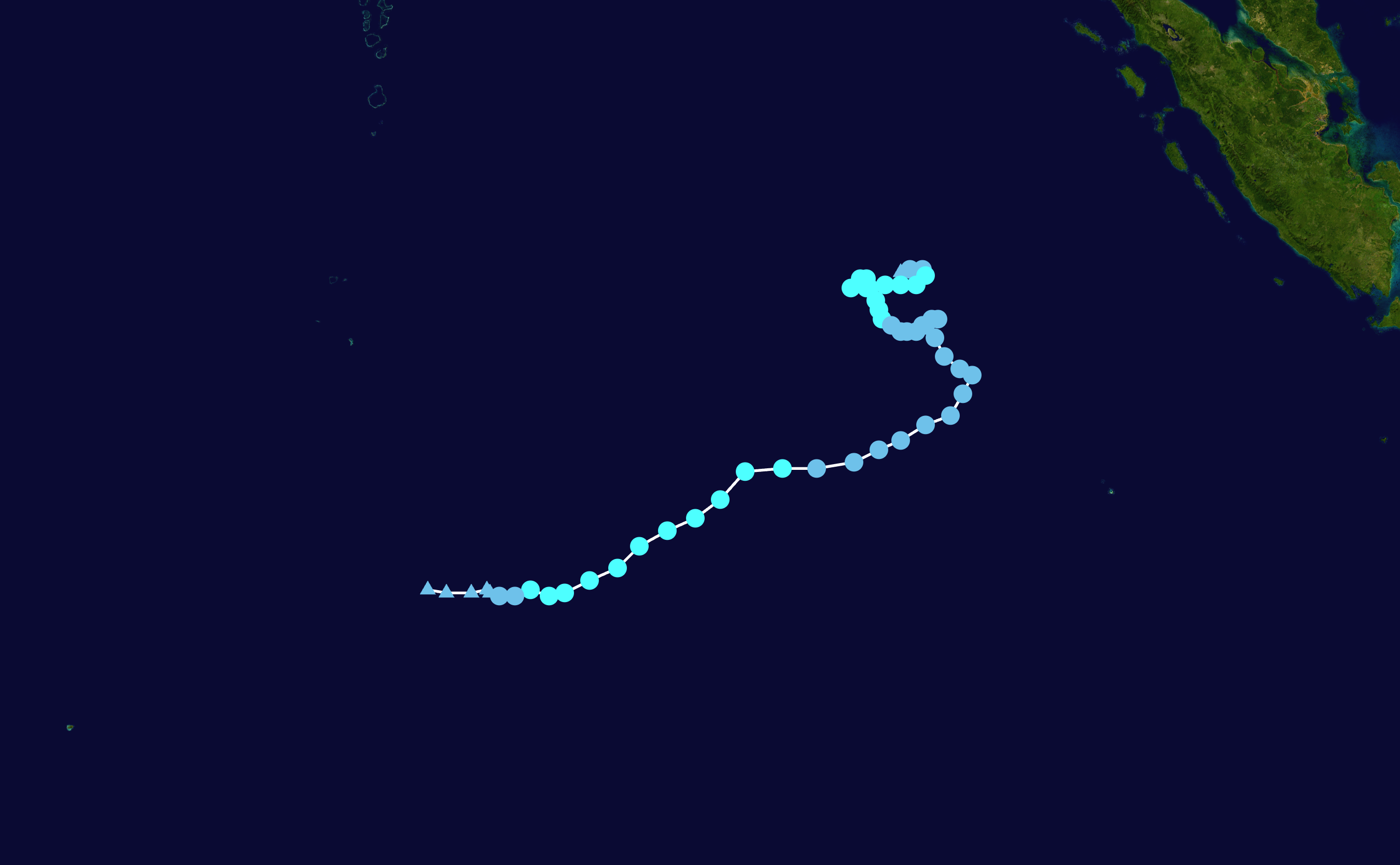
- Duration: 10 November (Entered basin) – 20 November
- Peak intensity: 100 km/h (65 mph) (10-min); 987 hPa (mbar)

A weak low-pressure system developed in the equatorial Indian Ocean in Météo-France's area of responsibility on 1 November and moved slowly eastwards over the following few days while showing little signs of intensification. Late on 9 November, as the developing precursor depression to Very Severe Cyclonic Storm Gaja in the Bay of Bengal moved further away and the competing low-level airflow convergence associated with it diminished, which was earlier associated with the westerly wind burst on either side of Indian Ocean. the system's structure organised sufficiently to be classified as a tropical disturbance by Météo-France. Very shortly afterwards, the system crossed the 90th meridian east and entered the Australian region, where it was classified by TCWC Jakarta as a tropical depression on 10 November local time. Later the same day, the JTWC assessed the developing low as having attained tropical storm status on the Saffir–Simpson hurricane wind scale, and assigned the system the unofficial designation 04S. A few hours later, at 10:00 UTC, the system moved back westwards and returned to the South-West Indian Ocean basin, where it gained the name 'Bouchra' from Météo-France and underwent a twelve-hour phase of rapid intensification to severe tropical storm status.

Over the following days, Bouchra fought increasingly unfavorable atmospheric conditions, and underwent a gradual weakening trend. During this time, the cyclone proceeded to track in a slow cyclonic loop just to the west of the border of the Australian region in weak overall steering influences, and was often quasi-stationary. After meandering here for a number of days, the system re-entered the Australian region late on 12 November. By this stage, the system had weakened significantly from its peak intensity, and was only at tropical depression strength. The period of residence in the Australian basin proved to be short-lived once again, however, with Météo-France indicating that Ex-Tropical Storm Bouchra had returned to the far eastern part of their area of responsibility early on 13 November. In the early hours of 14 November, the Australian Bureau of Meteorology noted that the system had crossed back into the Australian region basin. However, on 17 November, Bouchra crossed back over into the South-West Indian Ocean basin, as the storm began taking a southwestward trajectory.

=== Intense Tropical Cyclone Kenanga ===
- Intense tropical cyclone (MFR)
- Category 4 tropical cyclone (SSHWS)
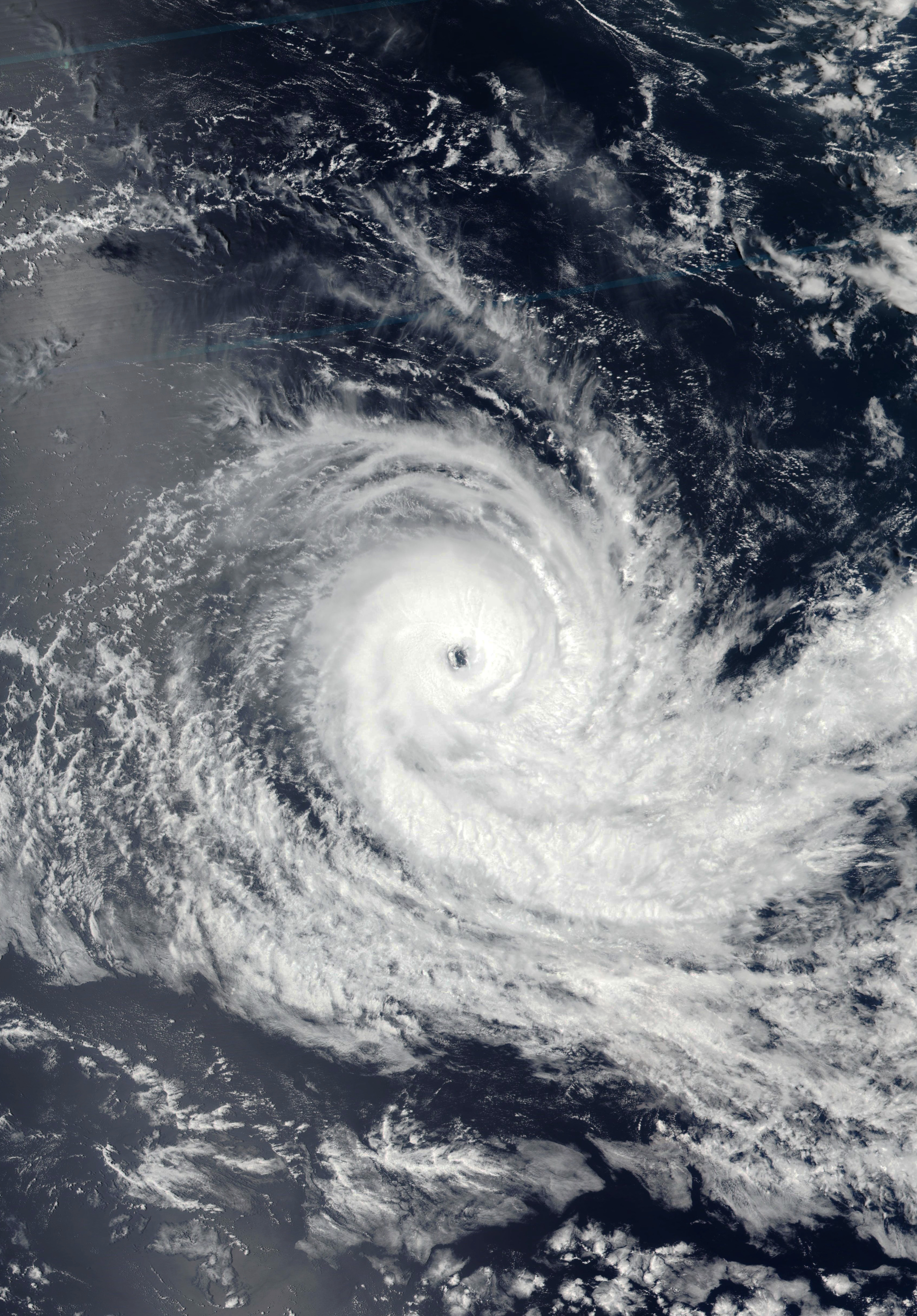
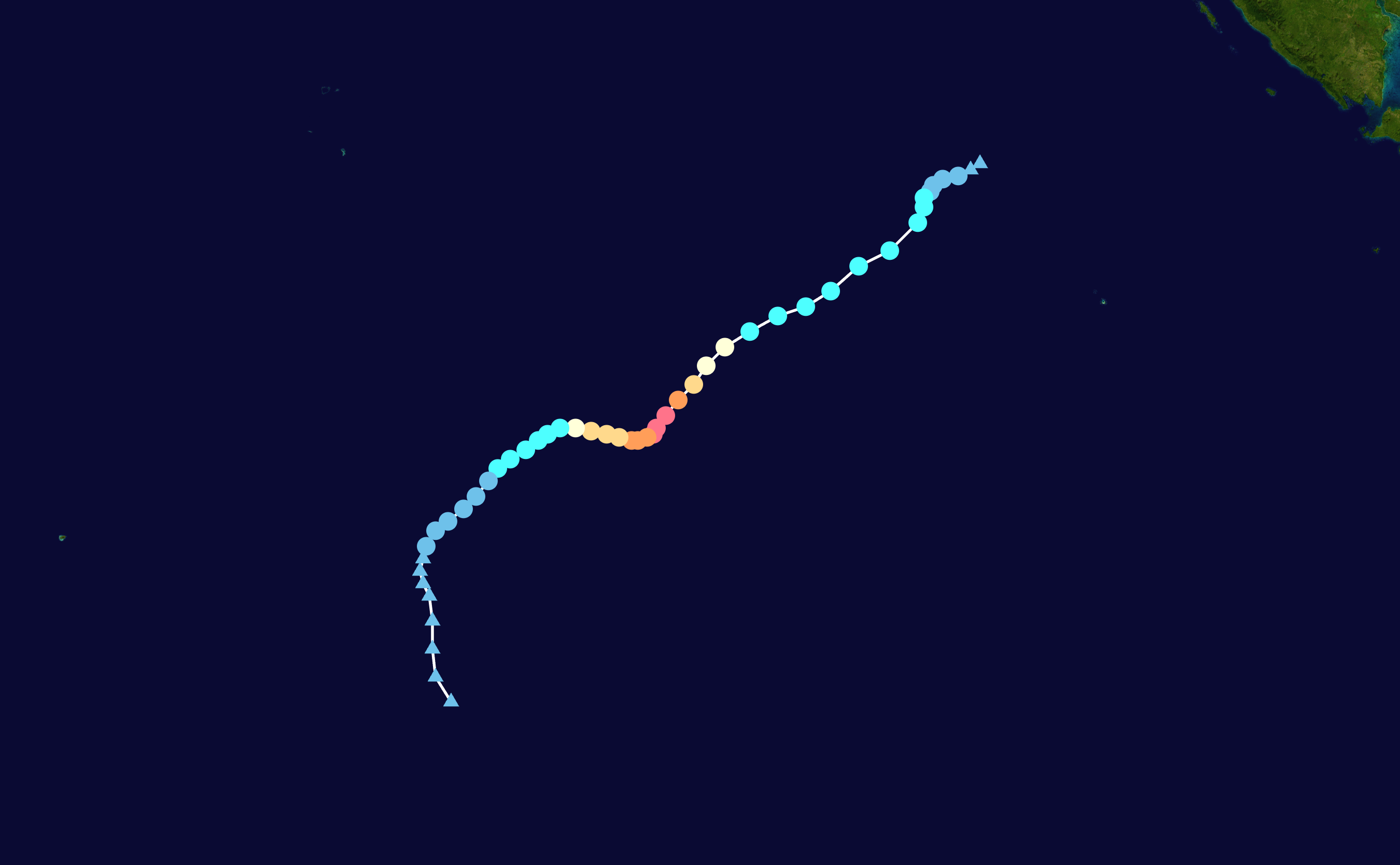
- Duration: 16 December (Entered basin) – 22 December
- Peak intensity: 185 km/h (115 mph) (10-min); 955 hPa (mbar)

On 16 December, Tropical Cyclone Kenanga from the Australian region entered the basin, retaining its name from TCWC Jakarta and becoming re-classified as a moderate tropical storm. The storm's acceleration southwest circumvented the effects of vertical wind shear, facilitating the formation of a central dense overcast. Owing to favorable upper-level conditions, Kenanga transitioned into an annular tropical cyclone on 18 December. The storm quickly intensified, peaking with 10-minute winds of 185 km/h (115 mph) assessed by MFR and Category 4-equivalent winds of 215 km/h (130 mph) assessed by the JTWC early on the next day. Kenanga maintained its annular characteristics while dry air began to weaken convection over the southeast quadrant. Throughout the day, Kenanga held the intense tropical cyclone threshold until 20 December, when convective clouds began to warm up, signaling a weakening trend. The eye disappeared, as the cyclone, located 1,432 km (890 mi) southeast of Diego Garcia, tracked over an area of high wind shear and cooler waters. Moving westward, Kenanga weakened into a severe tropical storm from dry air on 21 December. By the next day, the large and ragged circulation became exposed on satellite imagery. Kenanga continued to deteriorate into a moderate tropical storm, steering southward under the influence of Cyclone Cilida southwest of the storm. Early on the next day, the MFR categorised Kenanga as a remnant low. With no thunderstorm activity in the system's centre, the MFR issued its final bulletin. Kenanga persisted for three more days before dissipating on 26 December.

=== Intense Tropical Cyclone Cilida ===
- Intense tropical cyclone (MFR)
- Category 4 tropical cyclone (SSHWS)
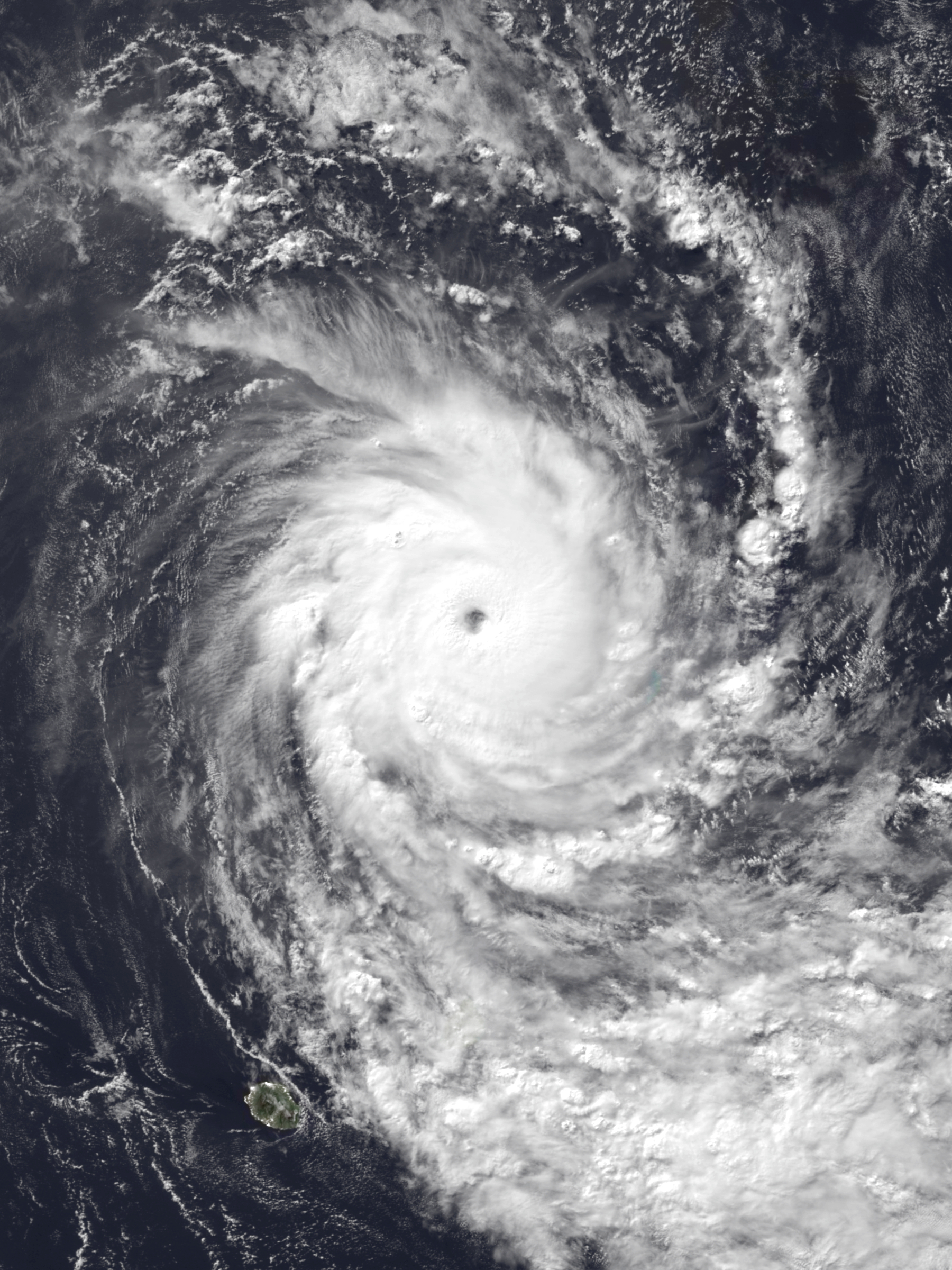
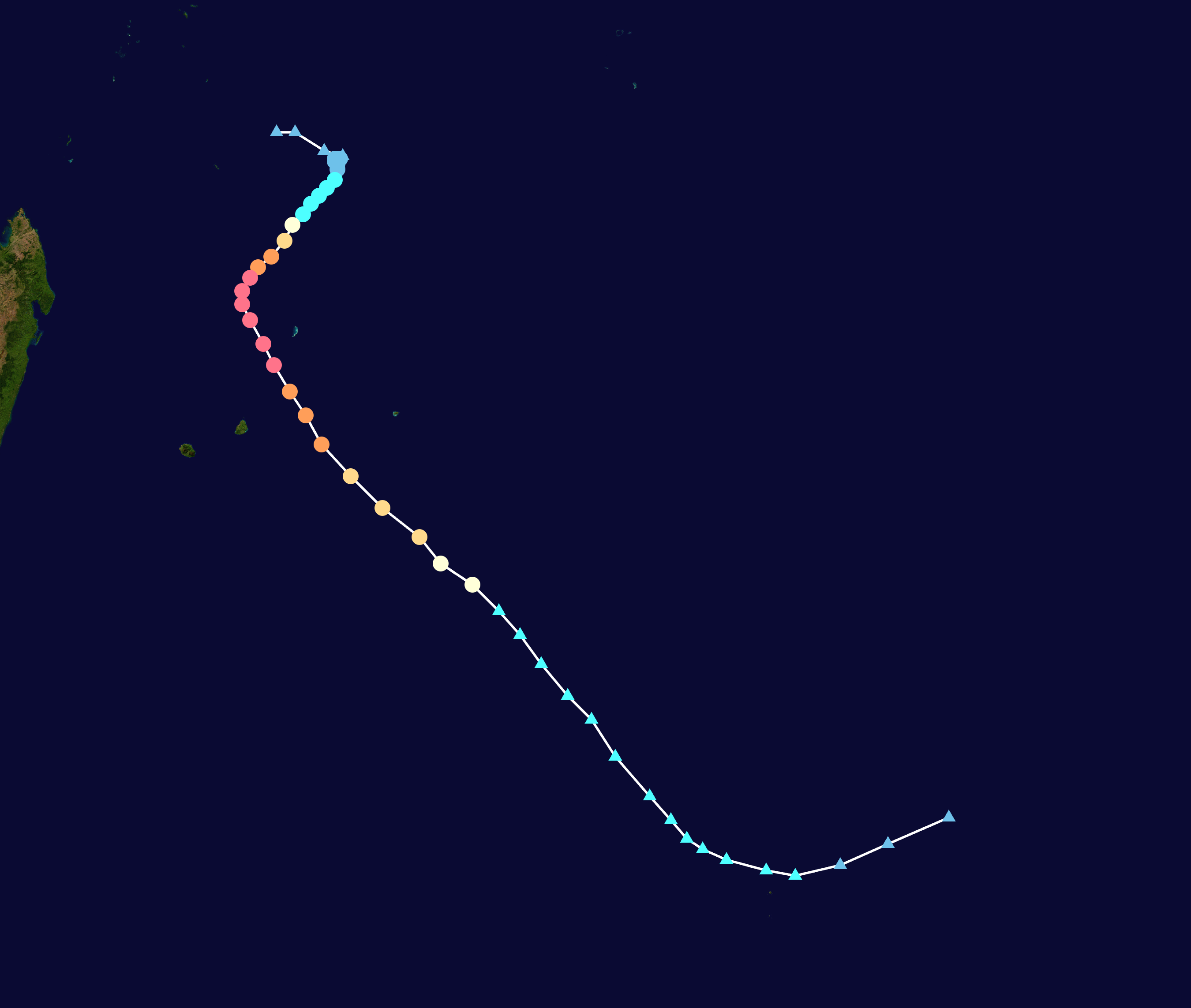
- Duration: 18 December – 24 December
- Peak intensity: 215 km/h (130 mph) (10-min); 947 hPa (mbar)

Around the same time as Kenanga's genesis, a cyclonic gyre west of Diego Garcia was detected within the monsoon trough. Convection organised around the low-pressure system (or low) for several days, and on 18 December, the MFR began issuing advisories on the system. The MFR further upgraded the disturbance to a tropical depression on the same day. On 19 December, the cyclone strengthened into a moderate tropical storm, prompting the MMS to give it the name Cilida. Cilida experienced steady intensification from outflow and warm seas, possessing fragmented rudimentary rainbands that mainly spiraled from the east. As time passed by, thunderstorms coalesced to form a dense overcast. Drifting southwestward, Cilida intensified into a severe tropical storm on 20 December. A period of rapid intensification caused by dual outflow channels then ensued; the eye pattern varied, surrounded by very cold cloud tops. Alongside Kenanga, Cilida was one of the first two tropical cyclones in the basin to exist simultaneously since Intense Tropical Cyclone Amara and Very Intense Tropical Cyclone Bruce of the 2013–14 season.

By the next day, Cilida had attained its peak intensity; the MFR estimated winds of 215 km/h (130 mph). Meanwhile, the JTWC estimated high-end Category 4-equivalent winds of 250 km/h (155 mph). On 22 December, convection in the western sector had weakened, indicating an eyewall replacement cycle, as Cilida started steering southeast. The cycle concluded the next day with a larger eye, though it was not well-defined. Cilida made its closest approach of Mauritius, being slightly below 240 km (150 mi) to the northeast. An increase in wind shear and decrease in sea surface temperatures gradually unraveled rainbands, suppressing outflow and weakening the storm. On 24 December, Cilida was downgraded to a severe tropical storm, and was later labeled a post-tropical depression at 18:00 UTC. The vortex elongated as the asymmetrical and shallow storm transitioned into an extratropical cyclone. It degenerated into a remnant low, before dissipating during 28 December.

Ahead of Cilida, Air Mauritius suspended all flights to Rodrigues. On 23 December, Cilida passed east of Mauritius, bringing beneficial rainfall and gusting winds that knocked down tree branches, blocking roads.

=== Moderate Tropical Storm Desmond ===
- Moderate tropical storm (MFR)
- Tropical storm (SSHWS)
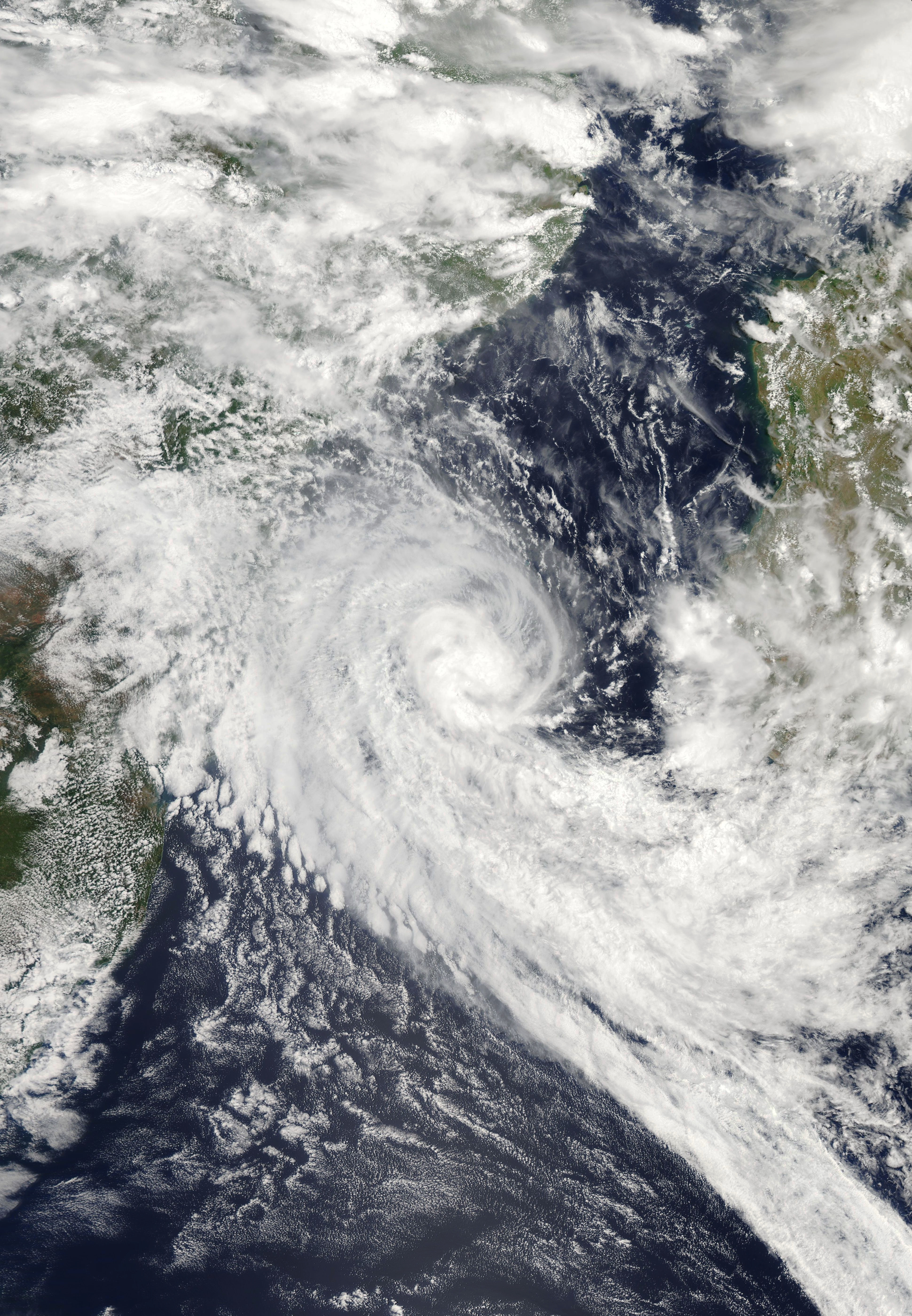
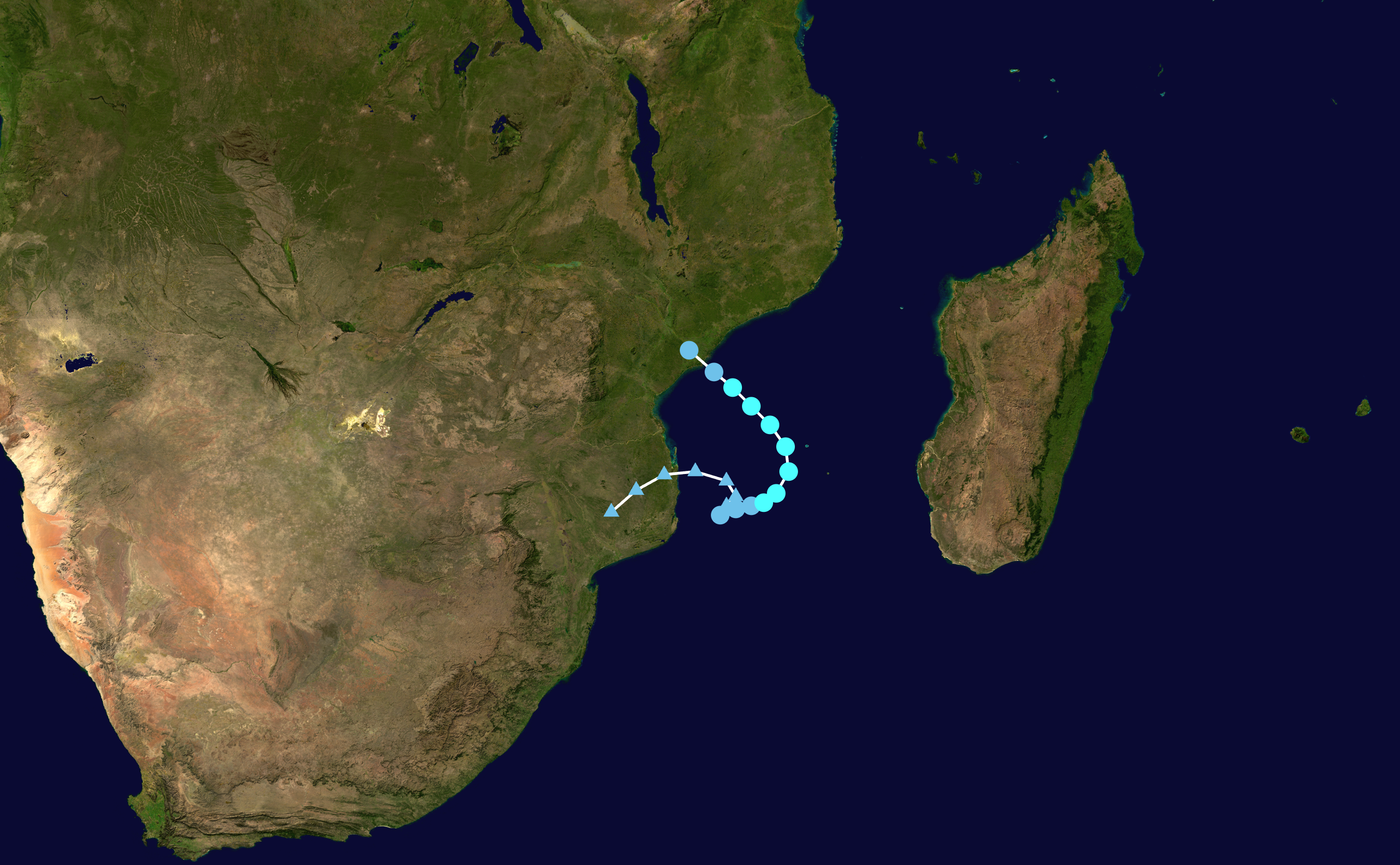
- Duration: 18 January – 22 January
- Peak intensity: 80 km/h (50 mph) (10-min); 995 hPa (mbar)

During the middle of January 2019, strong convection caused by converging trade winds persisted over the western half of the basin, organising around a low along the coast of southern Mozambique. The low spent days above the country moving east-northeast, before moving towards the sea, where it was designated a tropical disturbance on 18 January. It presented a weak structure to satellite imagery, with an ill-defined, exposed circulation holding convection to its east, accompanied by multiple vortices. However, the centre consolidated shifting northward, and on 19 January, the system strengthened into a tropical depression, before additionally organising into a moderate tropical storm later that day. Convection within the storm nearly collapsed, but was it was halted by a new cluster of thunderstorms, as Desmond recurved to a west-northwest track. Northwest of Europa Island, Desmond situated in a marginal environment of high wind shear and dry air alleviated by strong outflow, with its centre obscured by cirrus clouds. Towards the end of 21 January, Desmond made landfall near Quelimane in Mozambique, rapidly weakening overland and dissipating on 22 January.

Though the storm did not strike Madagascar, it enhanced rains in the northwest portion of the island. Desmond induced heavy flooding upon Beira, Chinde, and Quelimane in Mozambique, displacing around 120,000 people across the provinces of Zambezia, Sofala, Manica, and Tete. 277 mm (10.9 in) of 24-hour rain was recorded in Beira. Large waves smashed through sea defences, as the torrential rain flooded roads. Cars were submerged as floodwater entered people's homes and businesses. It destroyed infrastructure and minimally impacted crops. Approximately 150,000 acres (60,000 hectares) of crops were affected and over 1,000 livestock were killed. Three people were killed in the country. The storm then reached Malawi with minor effects. In the aftermath of the storm, the Mozambique National Institute of Disaster Management deployed drones to assess affected areas and set up evacuation routes, with the assistance of the European Union's Emergency Management Service.

=== Moderate Tropical Storm Eketsang ===
- Moderate tropical storm (MFR)
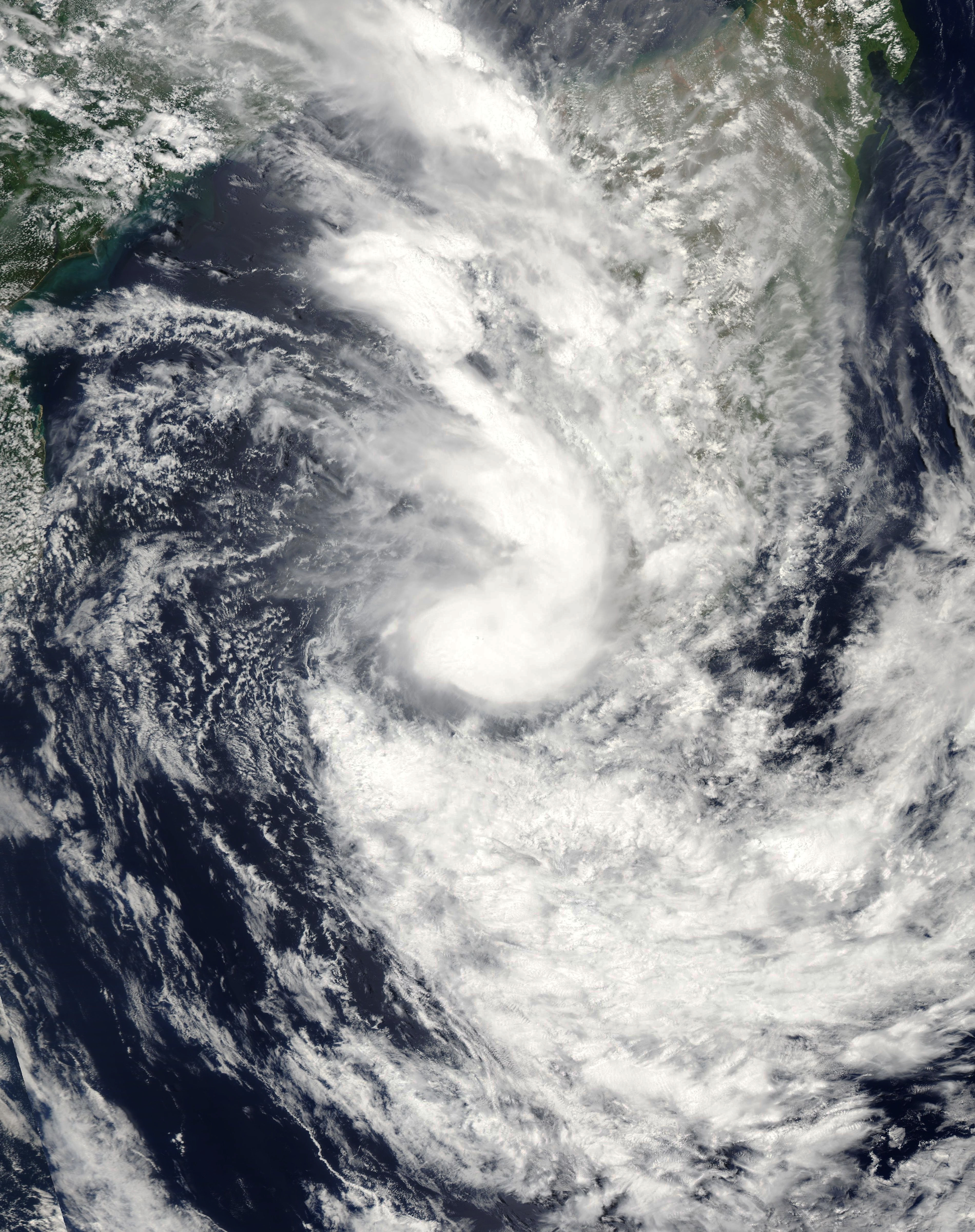
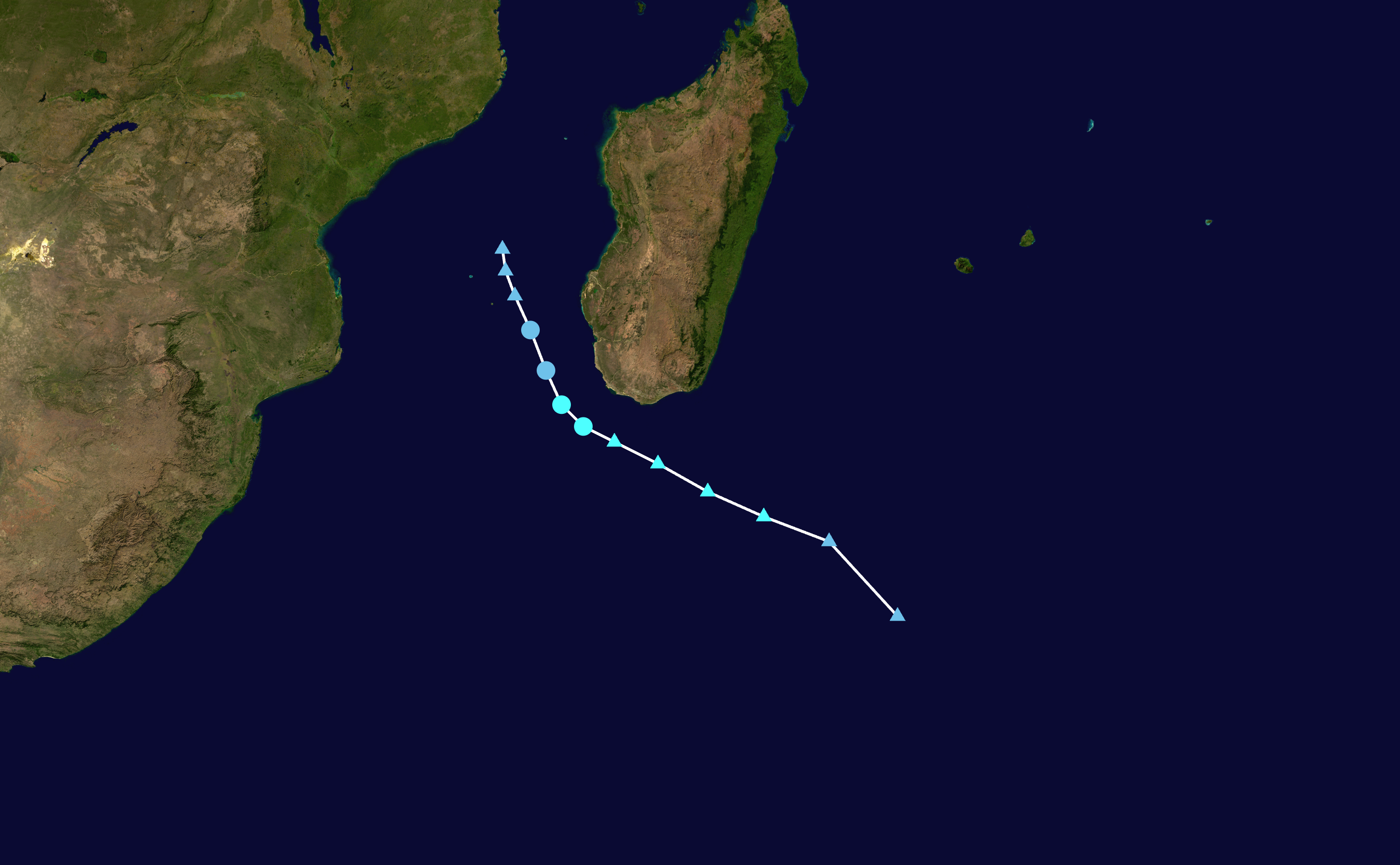
- Duration: 23 January – 25 January
- Peak intensity: 65 km/h (40 mph) (10-min); 995 hPa (mbar)

A poorly defined low northeast of Madagascar was detected by MFR on 19 January; the agency suggested that it would enter favorable conditions in the Mozambique Channel in the upcoming days. Along its path, the system poured rainfall over northern regions of Madagascar. The broad low then reached offshore, but its structure was not yet unified, though it was aided by warm seas and equatorial low-level convergence. By 23 January, the system evolved into a tropical disturbance, before additionally intensifying into a tropical depression, as thunderstorms obscured the defined centre. On 24 January, the system attained moderate tropical storm status, gaining the name Eketsang from the meteorological service of Madagascar (Météo Madagascar). Traversing southeast, Eketsang quickly began interacting with the baroclinic zone associated with an upper-level trough. By the following day, the storm became post-tropical, as the circulation continued to elongate and be disorganised. It was last noted on 26 January. The storm's remnants formed a cold front that affected the weather in the Mascarene Islands and extended over the Mozambique Channel, bringing thunderstorms over the Comoros and Mayotte.

Eketsang induced westerly winds that brought moisture from the Congo Basin to Tanzania. Prior to the storm's arrival, a yellow alert was issued for the regions of Atsimo-Andrefana, Androy, and Anosy in Madagascar, in addition to a heavy rain watch for the districts of Maintirano, Antsalova, Belo Tsiribihina, Morondava, and Manja. The storm produced double the expected rainfall for the month of January. Eketsang passed by southern Madagascar with heavy rains, killing 27 people, 18 of which were from landslides, 4 of which were from drowning, and the rest being from collapsing buildings. A person was also reported missing. 9,000 people were affected, with over 2,000 being displaced, as 1,778 homes were inundated and 187 were destroyed. The towns of Ambilobe, Antsiranana, and Morondava suffered the brunt of the storm, as roads became impassable.

=== Intense Tropical Cyclone Funani ===
- Intense tropical cyclone (MFR)
- Category 4 tropical cyclone (SSHWS)
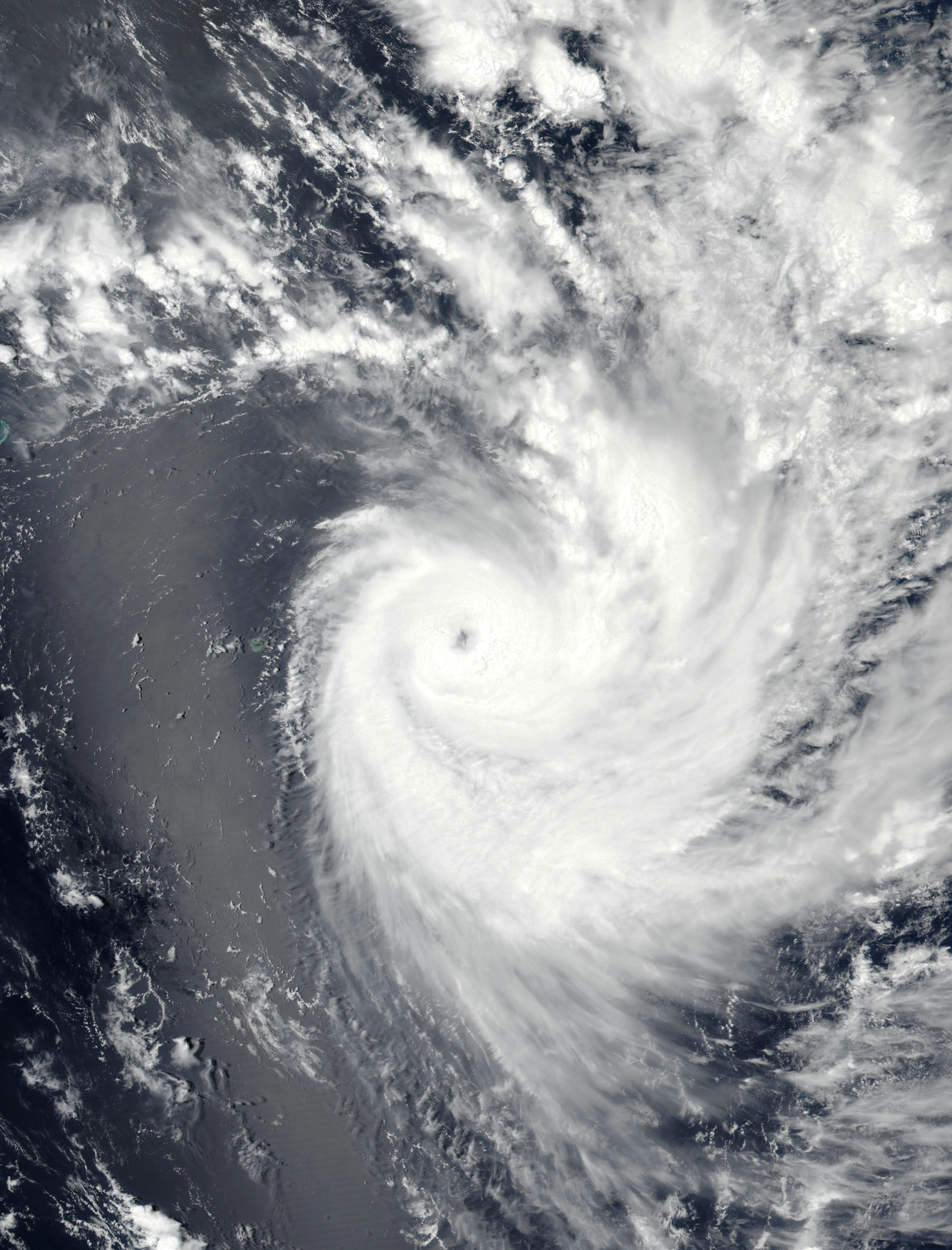
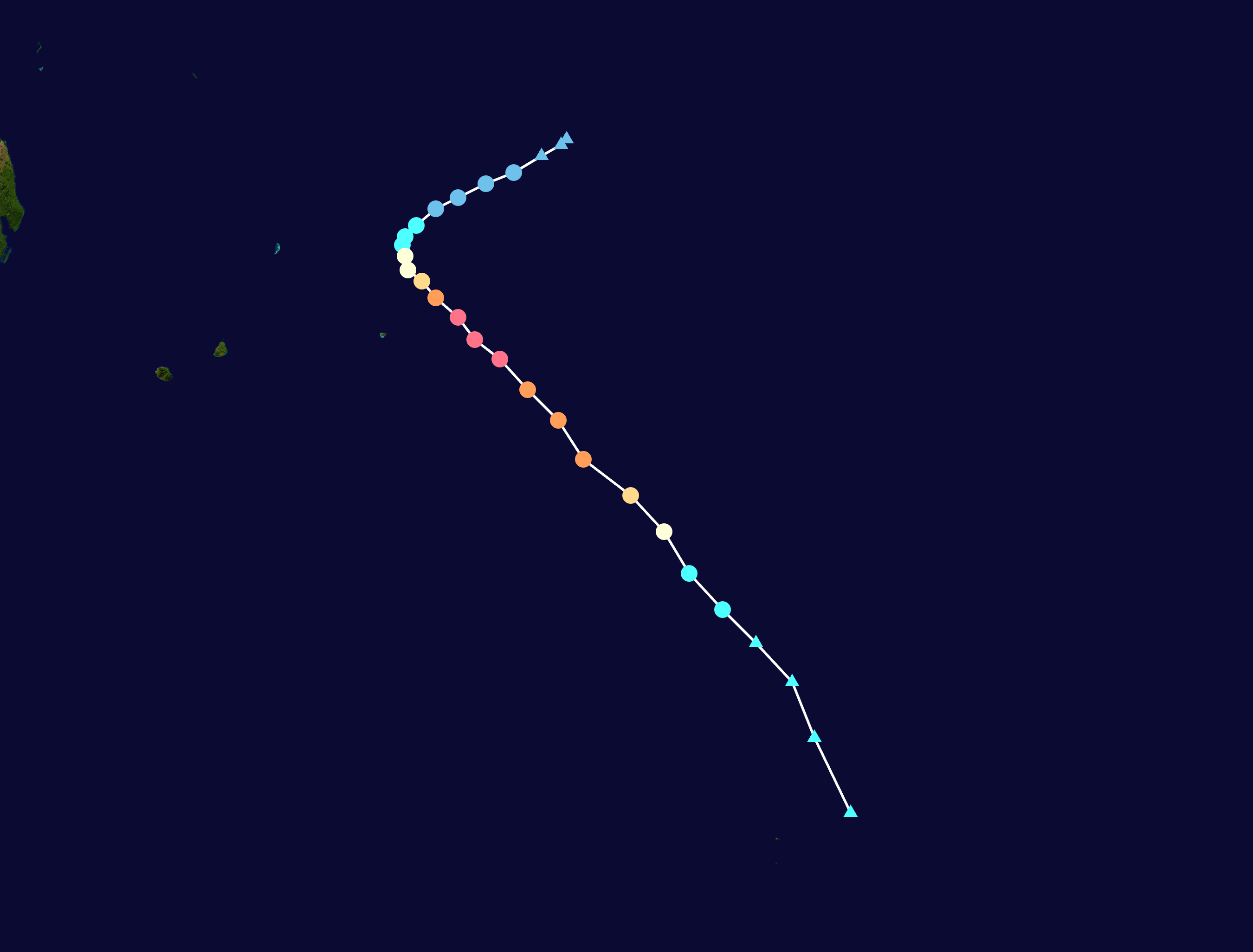
- Duration: 4 February – 9 February
- Peak intensity: 175 km/h (110 mph) (10-min); 943 hPa (mbar)

Towards the end of January and into the beginning of February, an area of strong thunderstorms persisted zonally with low-level westerly winds caused by a Kelvin wave. Despite being during a dry phase of the MJO, the Kelvin wave's interaction with a nearby, westward-propagating, equatorial Rossby wave gave the basin a potential of producing two low-level circulations, including one south of the Chagos Archipelago. The probability for cyclogenesis was further amplified by an increase of convergence in the monsoon trough brought by a ridge between the remnant center of Cyclone Riley from the Australian region and an inverted trough. Over the following days, convection was maintained in an unorganised circulation, but on 4 February, it was marked a tropical disturbance by MFR and later a tropical depression. Around 1,195 km (742 mi) east-northeast of Mauritius, the system consolidated within an environment of strong divergence aloft, low wind shear, and warm seas, with a broad circulation and northern deep rainbands over it. Though its centre was structured, dry air advected by trade winds obstructed intensification. Convection then became much more concentrated under weak vertical wind shear, leading to the cyclone intensifying into a tropical storm on 5 February and receive the name Funani from the MMS. Funani moved southwestward, before taking a southeast turn around a ridge to its east.

An ill-defined eye appeared over the asymmetrical storm, with convection primarily being over the eastern periphery. On 6 February, Funani was upgraded to a severe tropical storm. Under very warm waters of 30 °C (86 °F) and excellent radial outflow, Funani entered a period of rapid intensification, presenting a sharp 22 km (14 mi) eye with tightening banding features. Expecting Funani to pass 220 km (140 mi) of Rodrigues, the MMS issued a class II warning on the island. The threat also prompted officials to cancel six flights on Rodrigues. On 7 February, Funani peaked with 10-minute winds of 175 km/h (110 mph) and 1-minute winds of 220 km/h (140 mph). On the next day, microwave imagery revealed a second eyewall formation, indicating the onset of an eyewall replacement cycle. A sharp increase of wind shear caused by the upper-level westerlies then occurred and started to take a toll on Funani. While accelerating, Funani deteriorated into a severe tropical storm on 9 February, and after continuous convective depletion, Funani dissipated by 12:00 UTC on the next day as a post-tropical depression.

=== Intense Tropical Cyclone Gelena ===
- Intense tropical cyclone (MFR)
- Category 4 tropical cyclone (SSHWS)
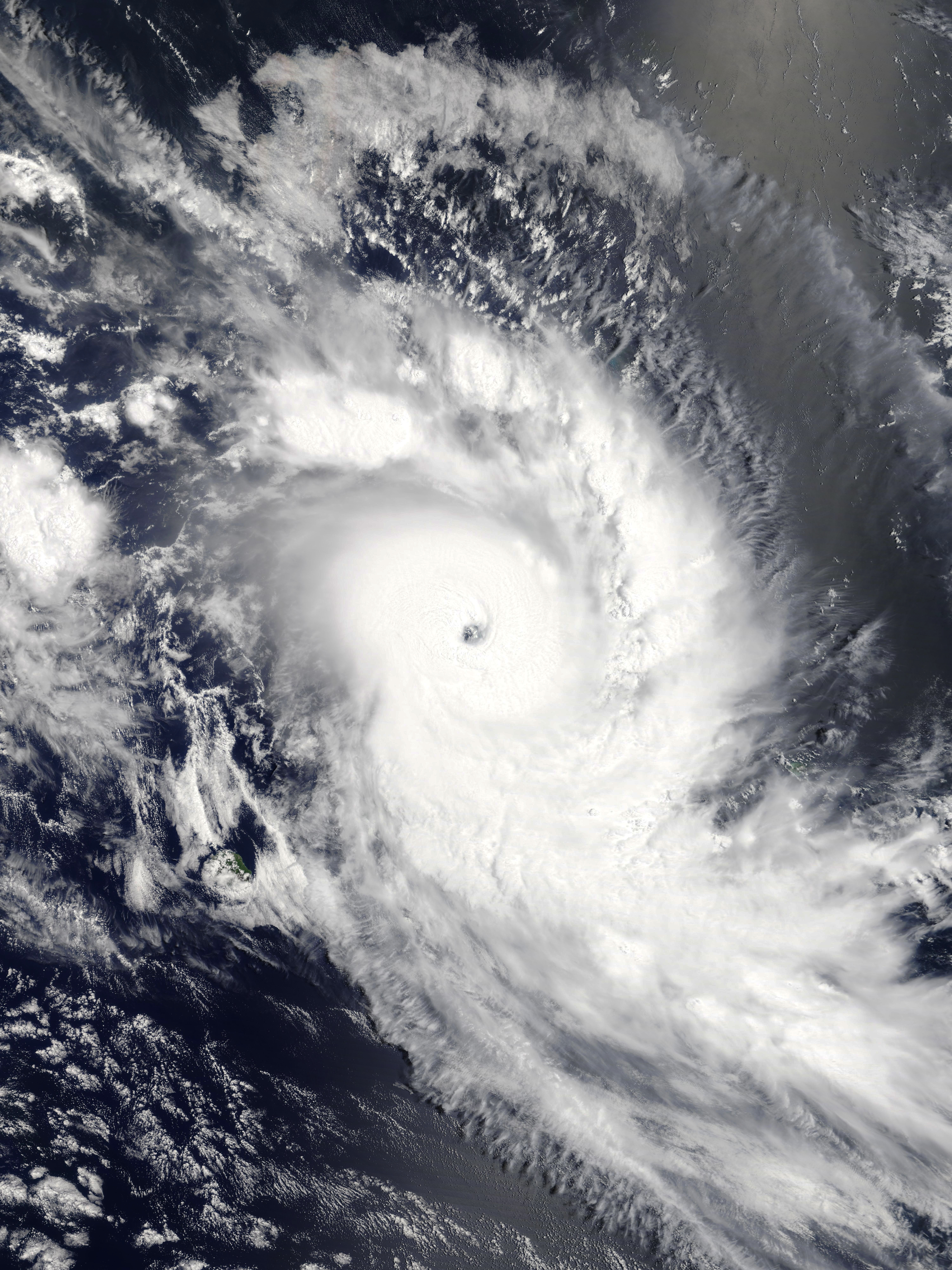
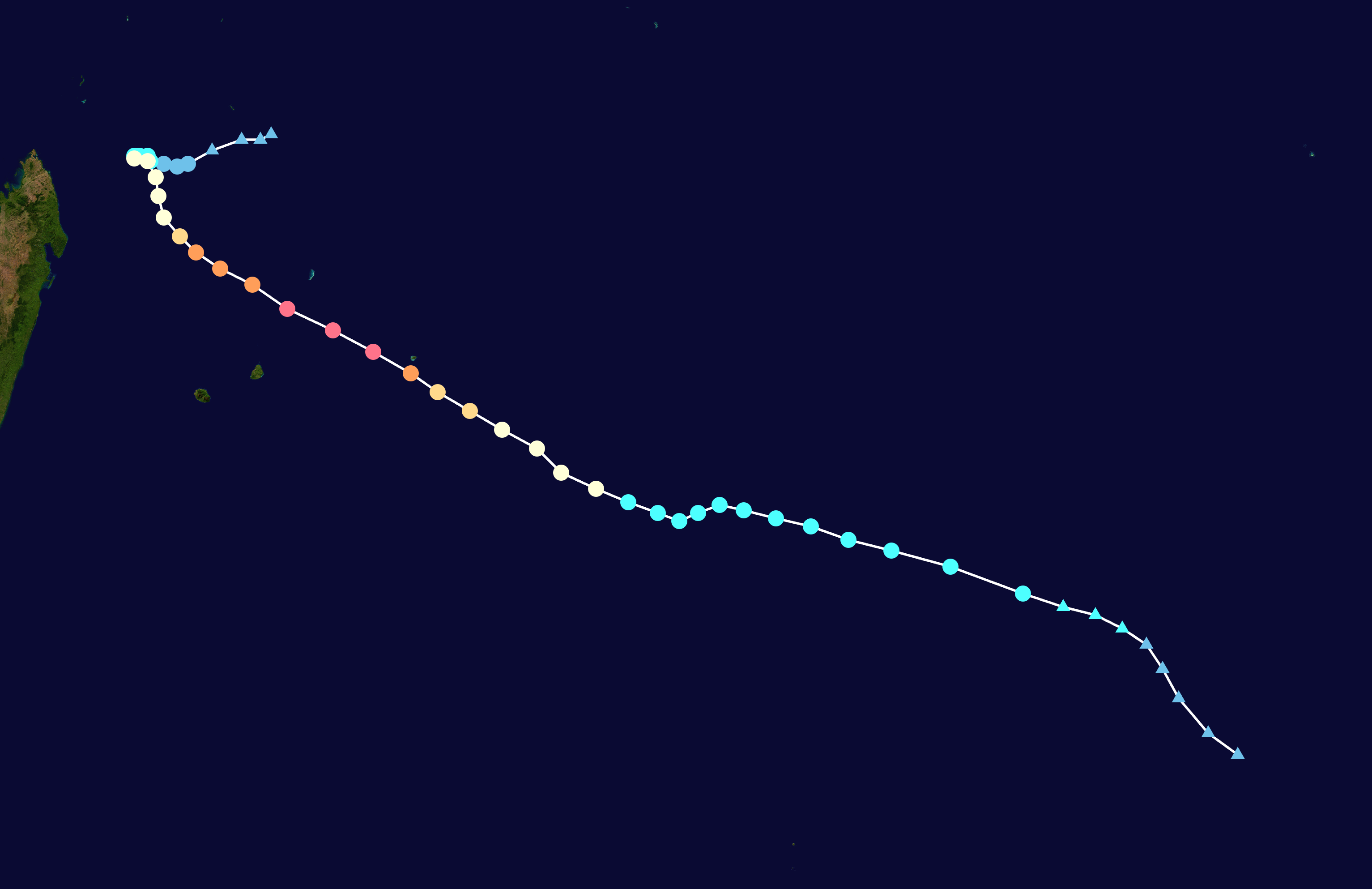
- Duration: 5 February – 14 February
- Peak intensity: 205 km/h (125 mph) (10-min); 938 hPa (mbar)

In addition to the pre-Funani disturbance, a circulation southeast of Agalega formed within the monsoon trough on 4 February. Drifting west-southwest, it strengthened into a tropical disturbance the next day, and then into a tropical depression. After a decrease in wind shear, the system intensified into a tropical storm on 6 February, earning the name Gelena from Météo Madagascar. Gelena formed a ragged eye and moved southeast at a slow pace. North-northwest of Port Louis, Mauritius, Gelena underwent more development as it trekked southeastward over warm waters. On 8 February, Gelena commence an eyewall replacement cycle. Upon completion, Gelena began rapidly intensifying, owing to dual outflow channels. The storm accelerated towards east, attenuating the effects of vertical wind shear. With robust deep convection surrounding the small eye, Gelena peaked on the next day, with MFR estimating winds of 205 km/h (125 mph) and the JTWC estimating winds of 220 km/h (140 mph). The cyclone then weakened from wind shear and dry air after decelerating. Gelena was downgraded to a severe tropical storm by 11 February. The storm additionally weakened into a moderate tropical storm on 13 February, following the degrading of its centre. As Gelena interacted with stratospheric dry air, MFR declared the storm as post-tropical on 14 February, stating that it had begun its extratropical transition. By 15 February, the storm began filling up, and dissipated on the next day over the central South Indian Ocean.

Gelena passed by northern Madagascar around early February, bringing cumulative rainfall to over 50% above average in the north. On 8 February, the Mauritius Meteorological Services (MMS) hoisted a class I warning for the main island and Rodrigues, before upgrading it to class IV—the highest level—two days later. Gelena struck Rodrigues on the night of 10 February, producing gusts of 160 km/h (100 mph). The storm left 90% of the 40,000 inhabitants without power, while 142 sheltered in refuge centres. Fallen trees blocked roads, broke down electricity cables and phone lines. The cyclone displaced 259 people and damaged infrastructure and private residences and farms. 43 boats were also affected, some of which could not be repaired. Overall damage on the island were about US$1 million.

=== Intense Tropical Cyclone Haleh ===
- Intense tropical cyclone (MFR)
- Category 4 tropical cyclone (SSHWS)
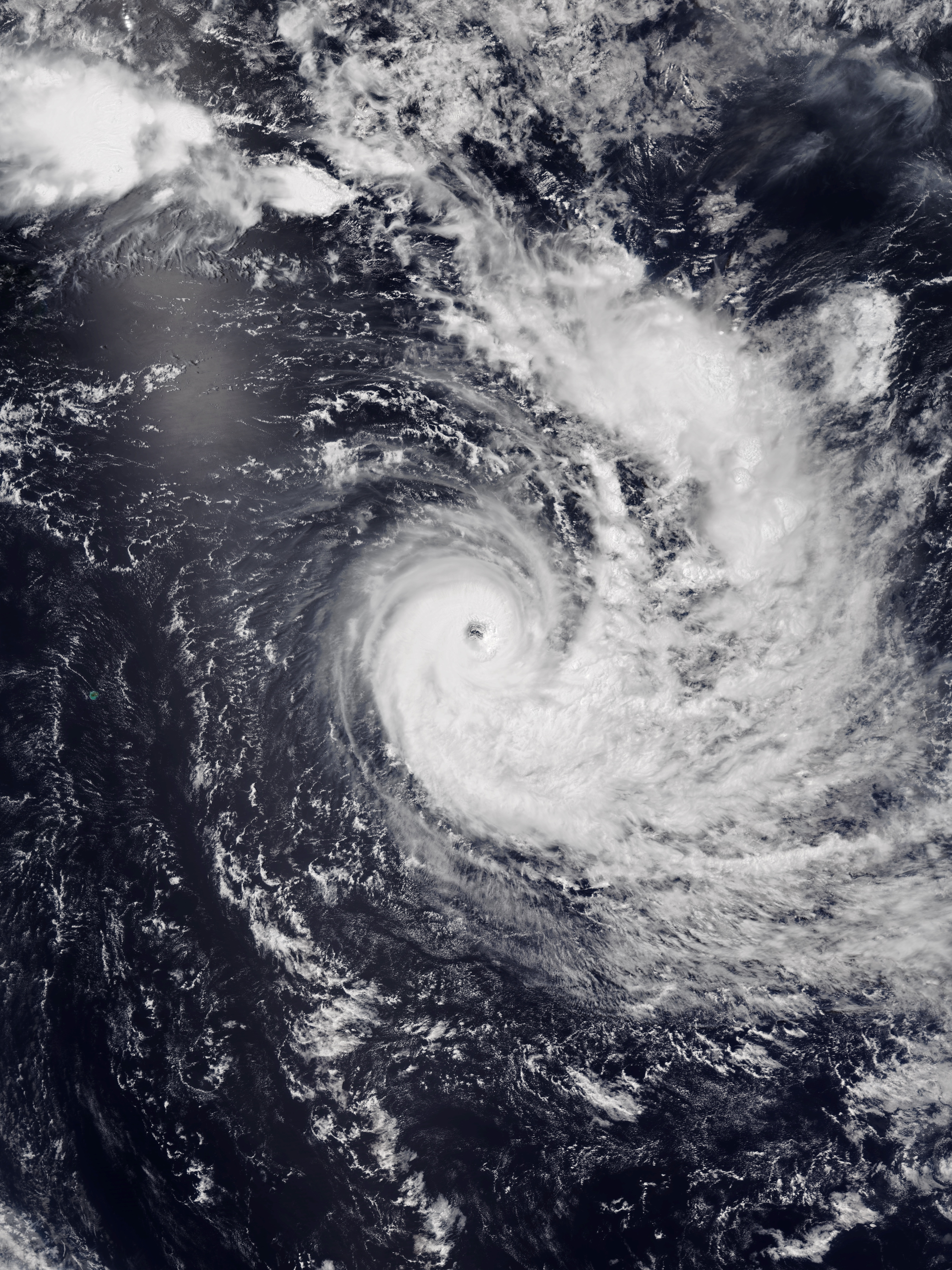
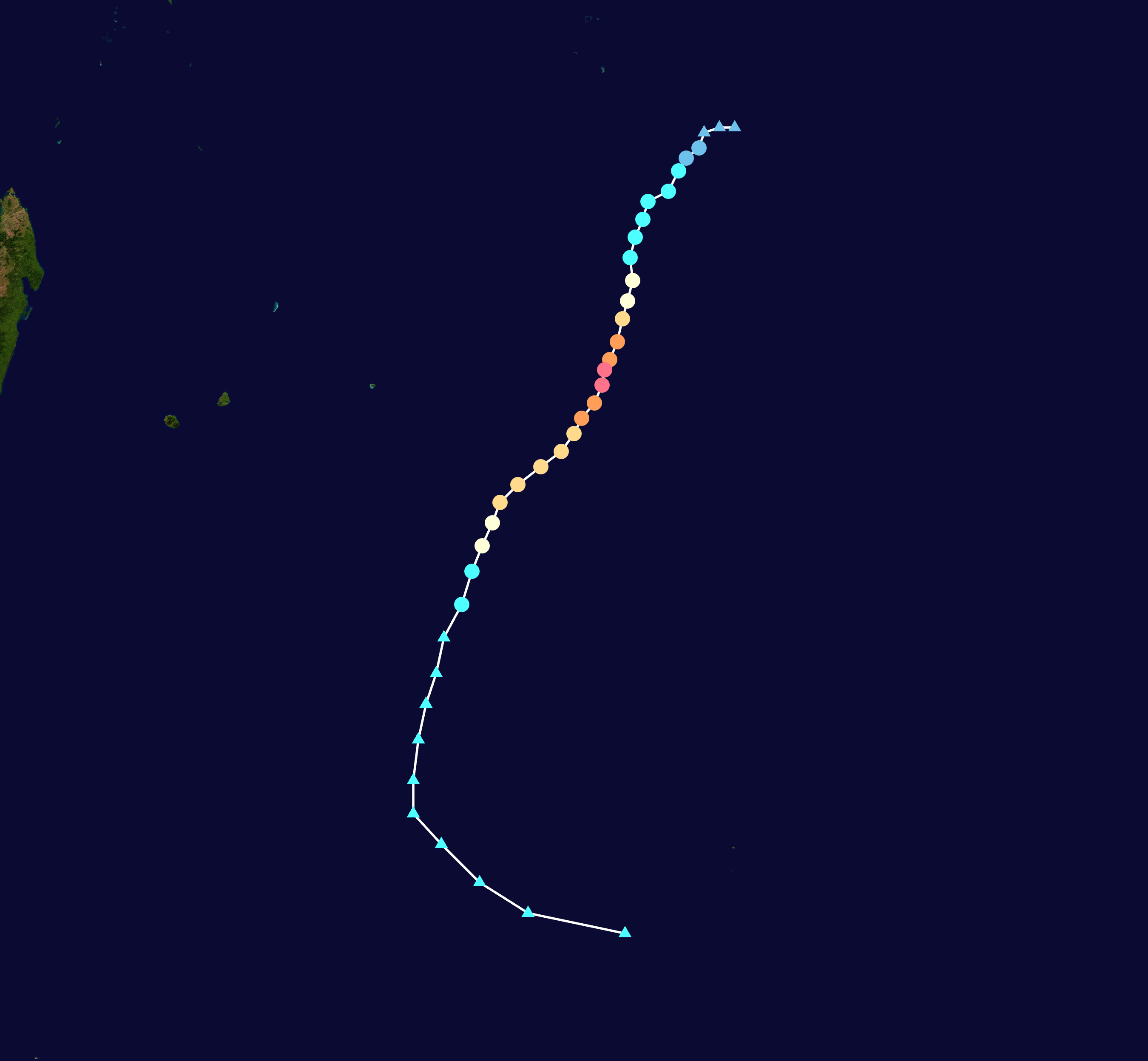
- Duration: 1 March – 7 March
- Peak intensity: 185 km/h (115 mph) (10-min); 943 hPa (mbar)

An active phase of the MJO in conjunction with equatorial wave activity led to the formation of three weak lows within the monsoon trough on the end of February, including one east of Diego Garcia. Convection stockpiled over the broad low-pressure area, as it organised over conducive conditions for development. After vorticity had increased within the system, MFR labeled it as a tropical disturbance on 1 March. The disturbance further strengthened into a tropical depression after microwave imagery had revealed a building compact centre and increasing convective banding in the system. A closed eye was later detected in the intensifying cyclone, causing MFR to upgrade the system to a moderate tropical storm on the next day. As Haleh moved south-southwestward, deep convection around the centre transformed into a very cold dense overcast; accordingly, Haleh was upgraded to a tropical cyclone on 4 March.

A pronounced eye emerged on satellite imagery around a robust ring of thunderstorms, with the storm aided by diminished wind shear and strong divergence aloft. Rainbands extending towards the equator tightened into the core of the expansive system. Haleh further strengthened into an intense tropical cyclone, and peaked with 10-minute winds of 185 km/h (115 mph). Meanwhile, the JTWC estimated winds of 215 km/h (130 mph). An upper-level trough over the north and west quadrants of Haleh hampered its outflow, weakening the system. In addition, the eye of the asymmetric system became cloud-filled. Convection shifted towards the southern periphery, as the storm maintained its tropical cyclone strength on 6 March. Haleh weakened into a severe tropical storm on 7 March from a sudden surge of wind shear. Conditions increasingly became more hostile with low ocean heat, and on the next day, Haleh became post-tropical. The storm transitioned into an extratropical cyclone later that day, recurving eastward, before dissipating on 10 March.

=== Intense Tropical Cyclone Idai ===
- Intense tropical cyclone (MFR)
- Category 4 tropical cyclone (SSHWS)
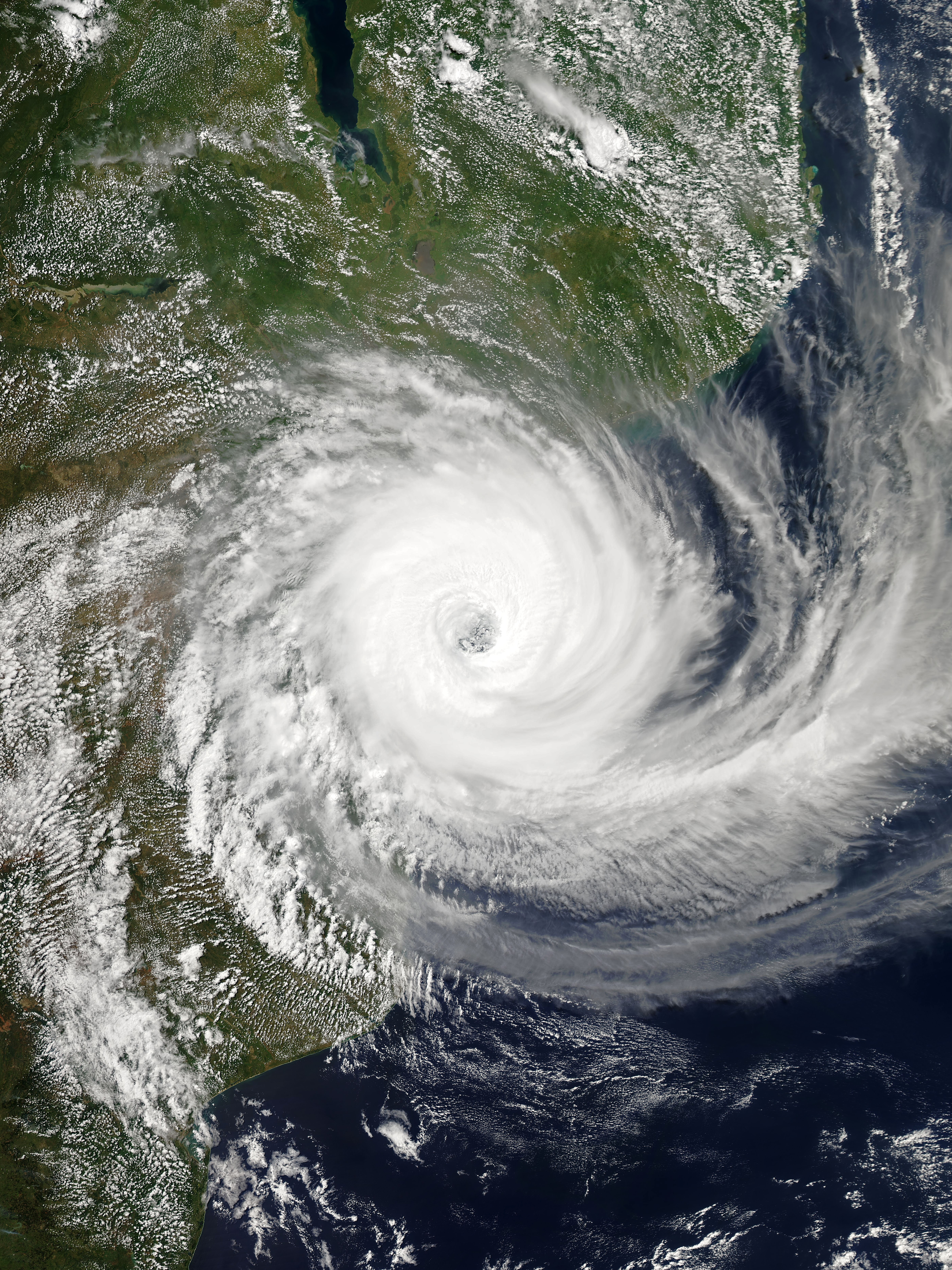
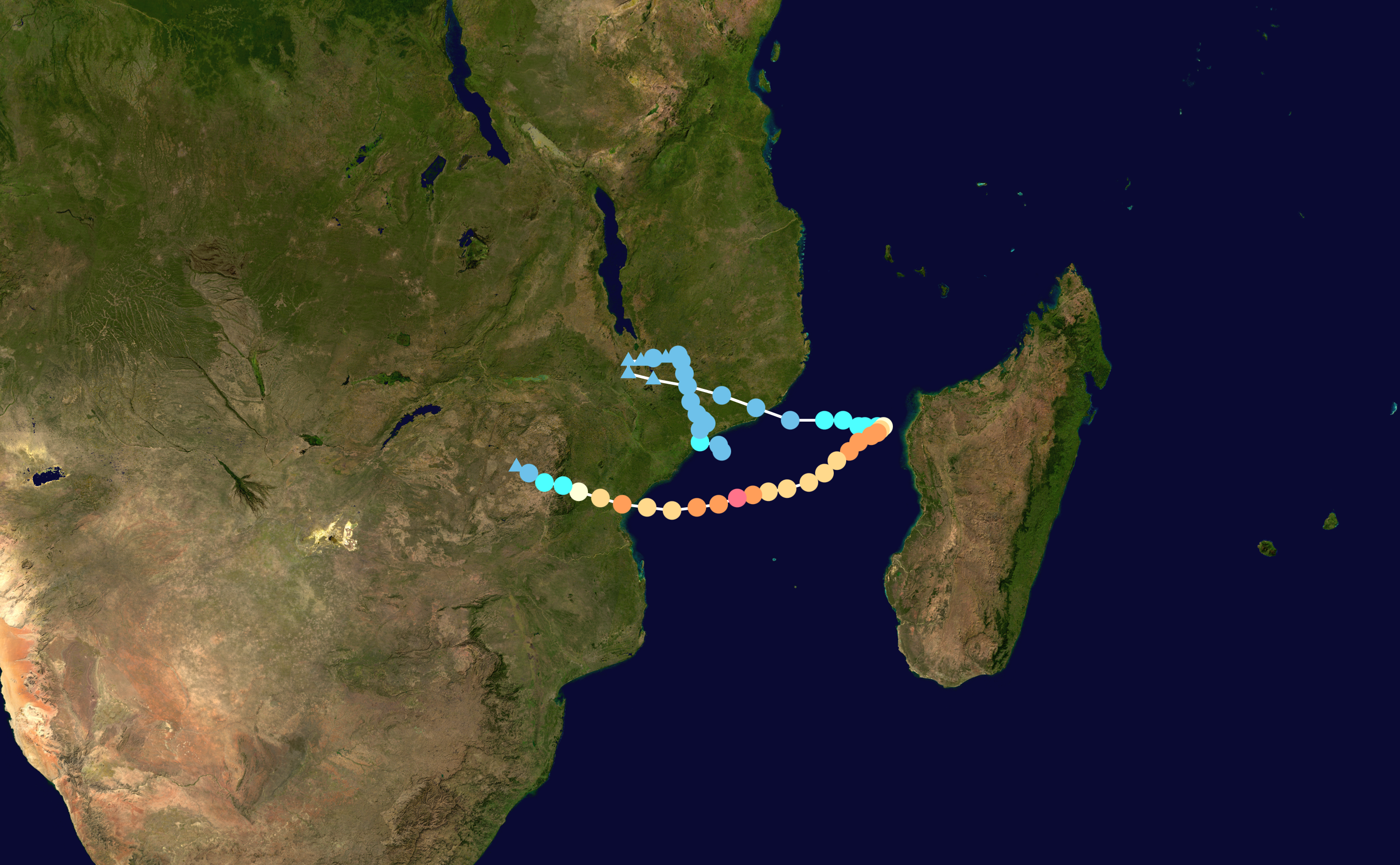
- Duration: 4 March – 15 March
- Peak intensity: 195 km/h (120 mph) (10-min); 940 hPa (mbar)

A tropical depression formed near the Mozambican coast on 4 March. It moved north-northwest while above Mozambique, and despite land interaction, its circulation was maintained by substantial upper-level divergence and low wind shear. The disturbance then executed a counterclockwise loop and headed towards the Mozambique Channel. By 9 March, the system was re-designated a tropical depression after re-entering the sea. Later that day, it organised into a tropical storm, receiving the name Idai. Exhibiting a symmetrical eye, Idai quickly intensified into an intense tropical cyclone on 11 March as it moved southwest. An eyewall replacement cycle was then started, weakening Idai. It ended with an annular eye and Idai again reaching the intense tropical cyclone threshold. Idai attained its peak intensity on 13 March, with 10-minute winds of 195 km/h (120 mph) and atmospheric pressure of 940 hPa (27.76 inHg). Idai made landfall at a coastline 40 km (25 mi) north of Beira, Mozambique on the next day. The storm rapidly weakened overland throughout 15 March, before dissipating on the following day.

As a tropical depression, Idai affected Malawi and Mozambique, during its first landfall. At least 56 people died, and 577 others were injured due to flooding in Malawi. About 83,000 people were displaced. The southern districts of Chikwawa and Nsanje became isolated by floodwaters. In Mozambique, 66 people were killed by the flooding, and affected 141,000 people. The Council of Ministers required 1.1 billion metical (US$17.6 million) to help those who were affected by the flooding. The second landfall was far more severe, and overall, Idai killed 1,593 people and left thousands more missing, becoming one of the deadliest tropical cyclones in the modern history of Africa and the Southern Hemisphere as a whole. With this death toll, Idai is the deadliest tropical cyclone recorded in the South-West Indian Ocean basin, and the second-deadliest tropical cyclone overall in the Southern Hemisphere, behind only the 1973 Flores cyclone. In addition, the total damages from the cyclone amounted to US$3.3 billion (2019 USD), which would make Idai the second costliest cyclone on record in the basin.

=== Tropical Cyclone Savannah ===
- Tropical cyclone (MFR)
- Category 2 tropical cyclone (SSHWS)
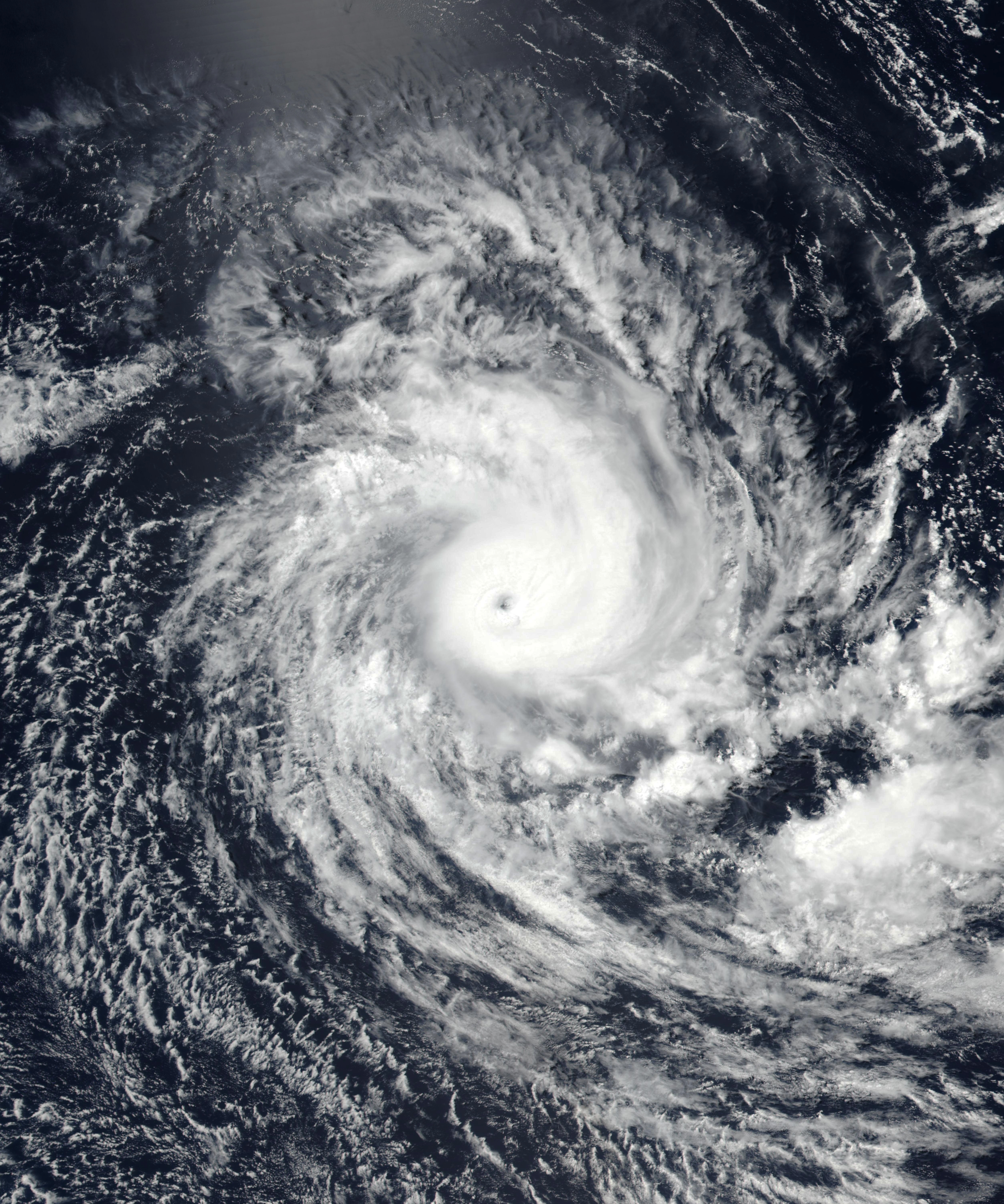
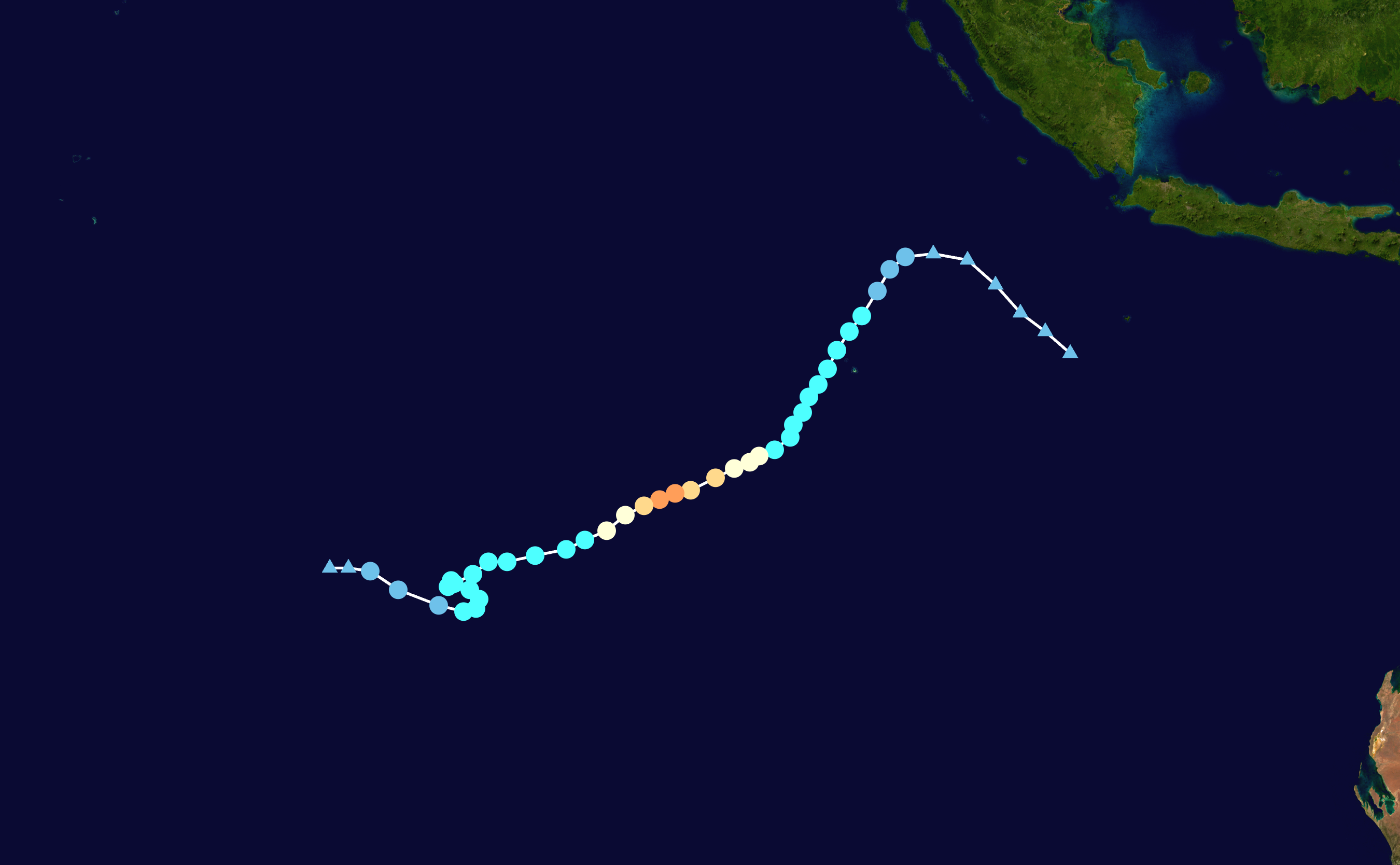
- Duration: 18 March (entered basin) – 19 March
- Peak intensity: 125 km/h (80 mph) (10-min); 978 hPa (mbar)

On 18 March, Severe Tropical Cyclone Savannah from the Australian basin entered the South-West Indian Ocean, shortly after its peak intensity. Overnight, persistent wind shear enabled dry air entrainment to the system's core. Savannah weakened from a severe tropical storm to a moderate tropical storm on 19 March, with convective activities no longer present. The storm continued westward along a subtropical ridge to the south as intensity further decreases. By the next day, Savannah had degraded into a remnant low. During 20 March, Savannah's remnant looped eastward, before turning westward on 21 March. The system weakened afterward, with Savannah's remnant dissipating on 23 March.

=== Intense Tropical Cyclone Joaninha ===
- Intense tropical cyclone (MFR)
- Category 4 tropical cyclone (SSHWS)
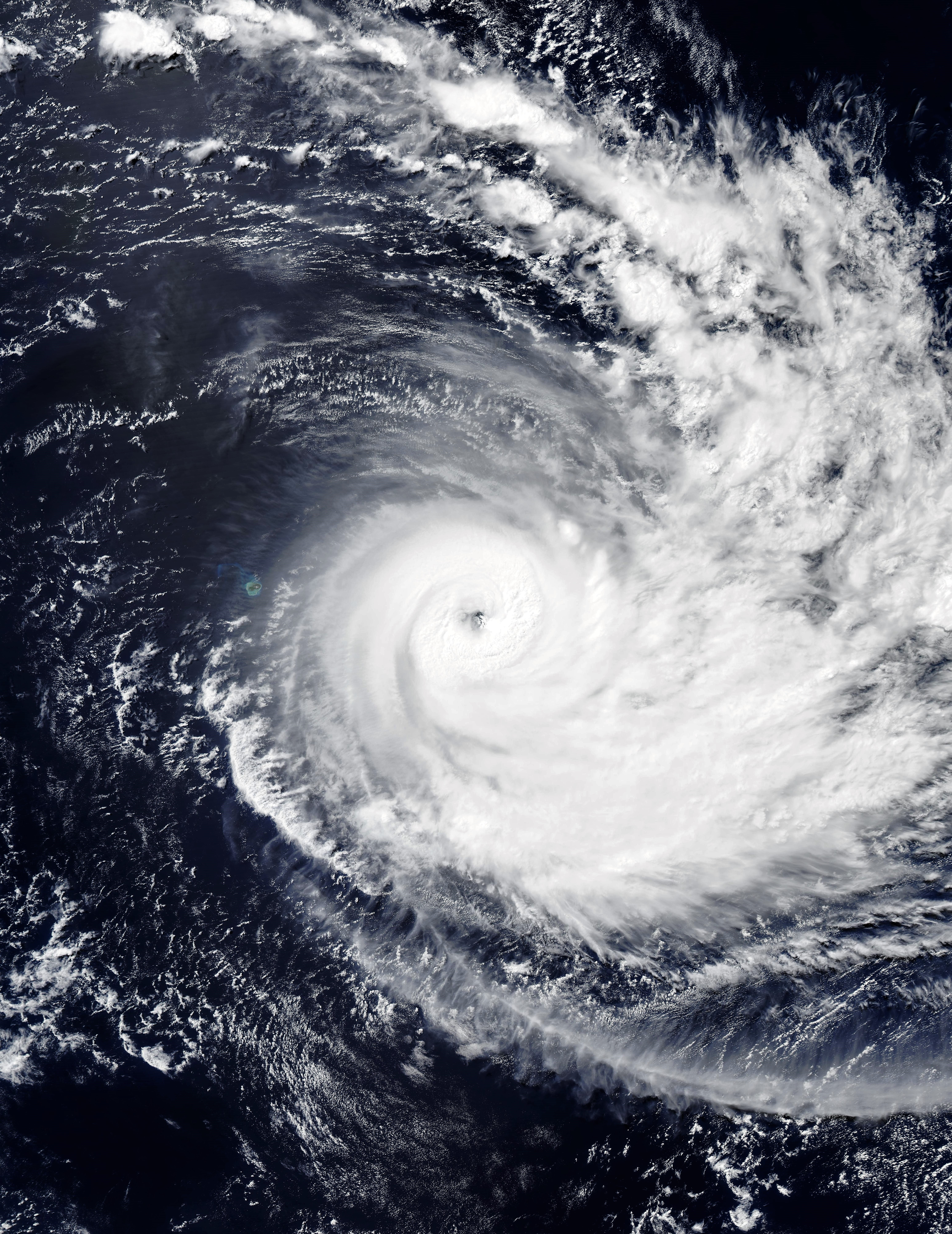
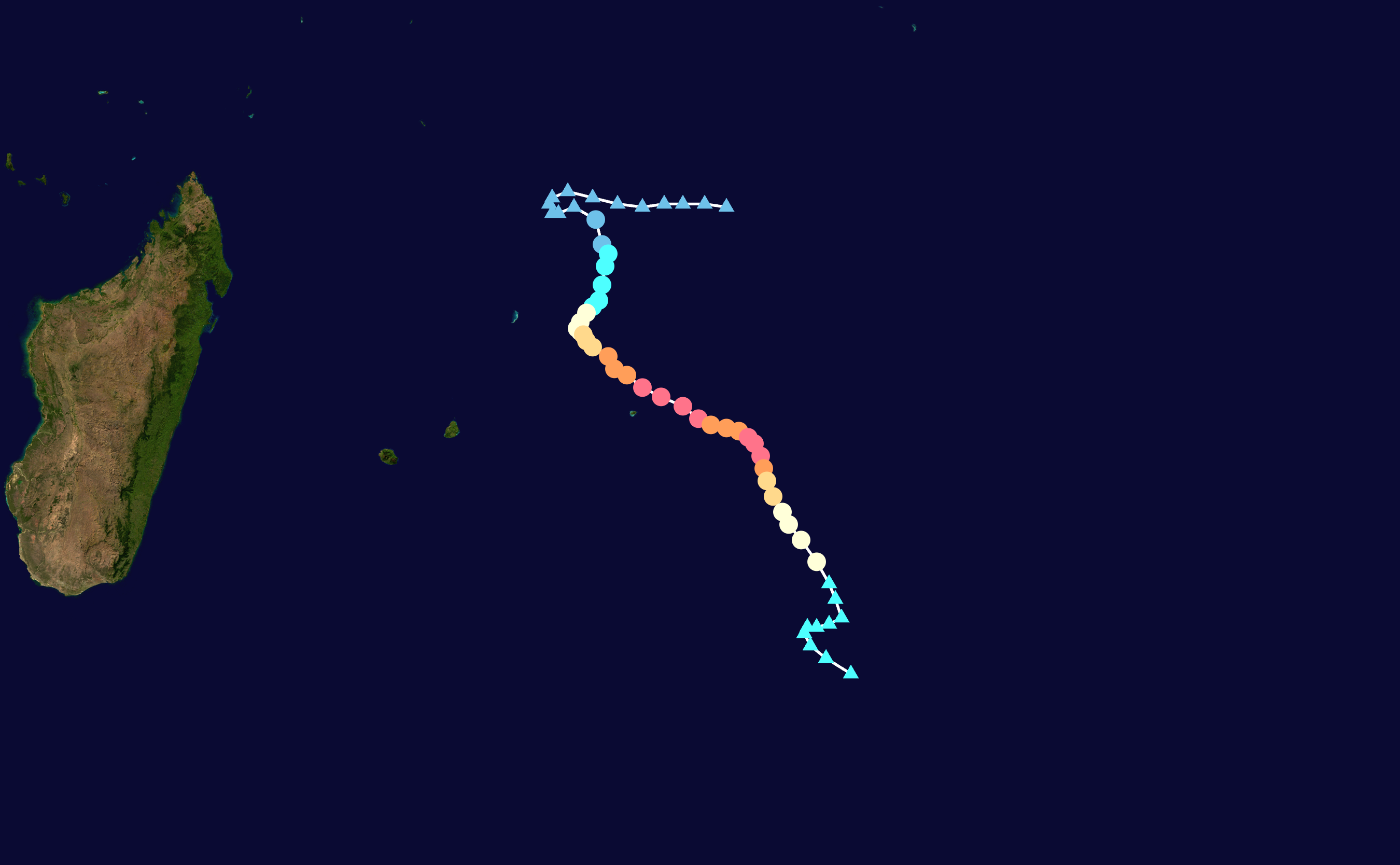
- Duration: 21 March – 30 March
- Peak intensity: 185 km/h (115 mph) (10-min); 930 hPa (mbar)

The monsoon trough produced a wide circulation at the centre of the basin on 17 March, that drifted westward. It organised for several days while north-northeast of St. Brandon, and by 21 March, the MFR began releasing advisories on the system. The system was upgraded to a tropical depression on the same day, and later to Moderate Tropical Storm Joaninha. Joaninha gradually intensified from outflow and high OHC, while it attained severe tropical storm strength on 23 March and move towards the south-southwest. A ragged eye then surfaced, and Joaninha changed course to head south-southeastward, strengthening into a tropical cyclone on 24 March. Very cold cloud tops prolonged overnight, prompting the MFR to upgrade Joaninah to an intense tropical cyclone early on 25 March. Joaninha then attained its initial peak on the next day with 10-minute winds of 185 km/h (115 mph) and 1-minute winds of 220 km/h (140 mph). A weakening trend then commenced, before Joaninha restrengthened, reaching a secondary peak on 27 March with the same estimates as the previous. The centre was well-defined and surrounded by annular cloud tops. However, an increase of wind shear began to weaken Joaninha. The storm fell below tropical cyclone strength on 29 March, as it continued to track over hostile environments. It then became post-tropical on 31 March, before degenerating into a remnant low on the following day. Joaninha's remnant was last noted on 4 April, and dissipated by 06:00 UTC.

Air Mauritius cancelled flights of Sir Gaetan Duval Airport on 25 March. A class IV warning was issued for Rodrigues on 26 March. As the storm approached, the Mauritius Red Cross sent fifteen volunteers to provide camp beds to the island. Joaninha made its closest approach to Rodrigues, being 80 km (50 mi) northeast of the island. Winds of over 100 km/h (62 mph) and 200 mm (7.9 in) of rain was recorded, with the highest gust measured at 161 km/h (100 mph). As 408 people sheltered in the island, Joaninha damaged electricity with its winds and obstructed roads. Being the second storm to strike Rodrigues in a year after Gelena, Joaninha destroyed 90% of the power grid on the island. Over 100 homes were damaged by the winds, with 29 being severely damaged. Four people were injured, including two women who broke their leg. 80% of plantations were destroyed, causing a significant loss of corn besides fruits. After the storm had passed, Mauritius Red Cross allocated hygiene kits, school supplies, and reconstruction materials for damaged homes, in cooperation with local emergency managers and government ministries of the county.

=== Intense Tropical Cyclone Kenneth ===
- Intense tropical cyclone (MFR)
- Category 4 tropical cyclone (SSHWS)
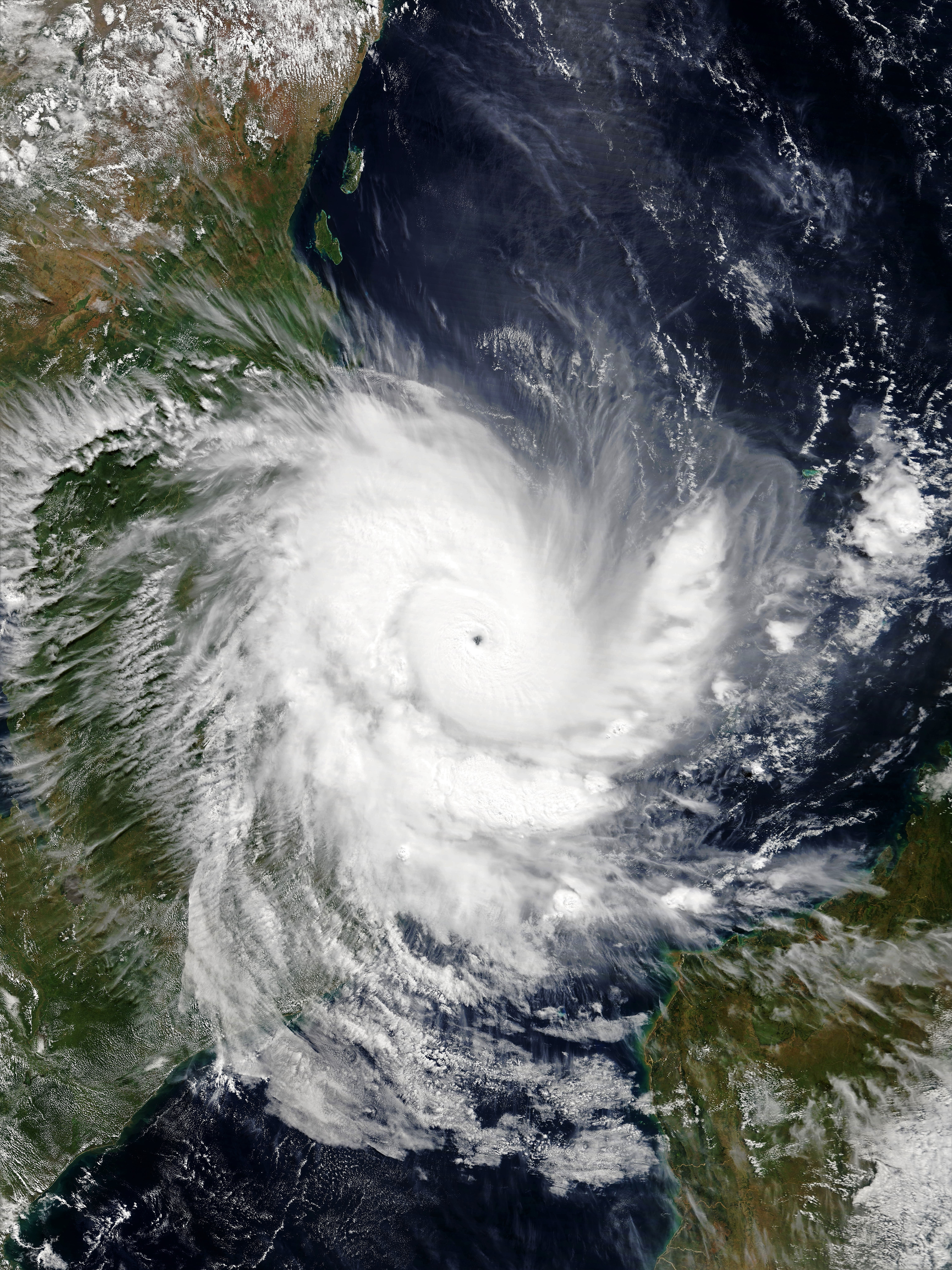
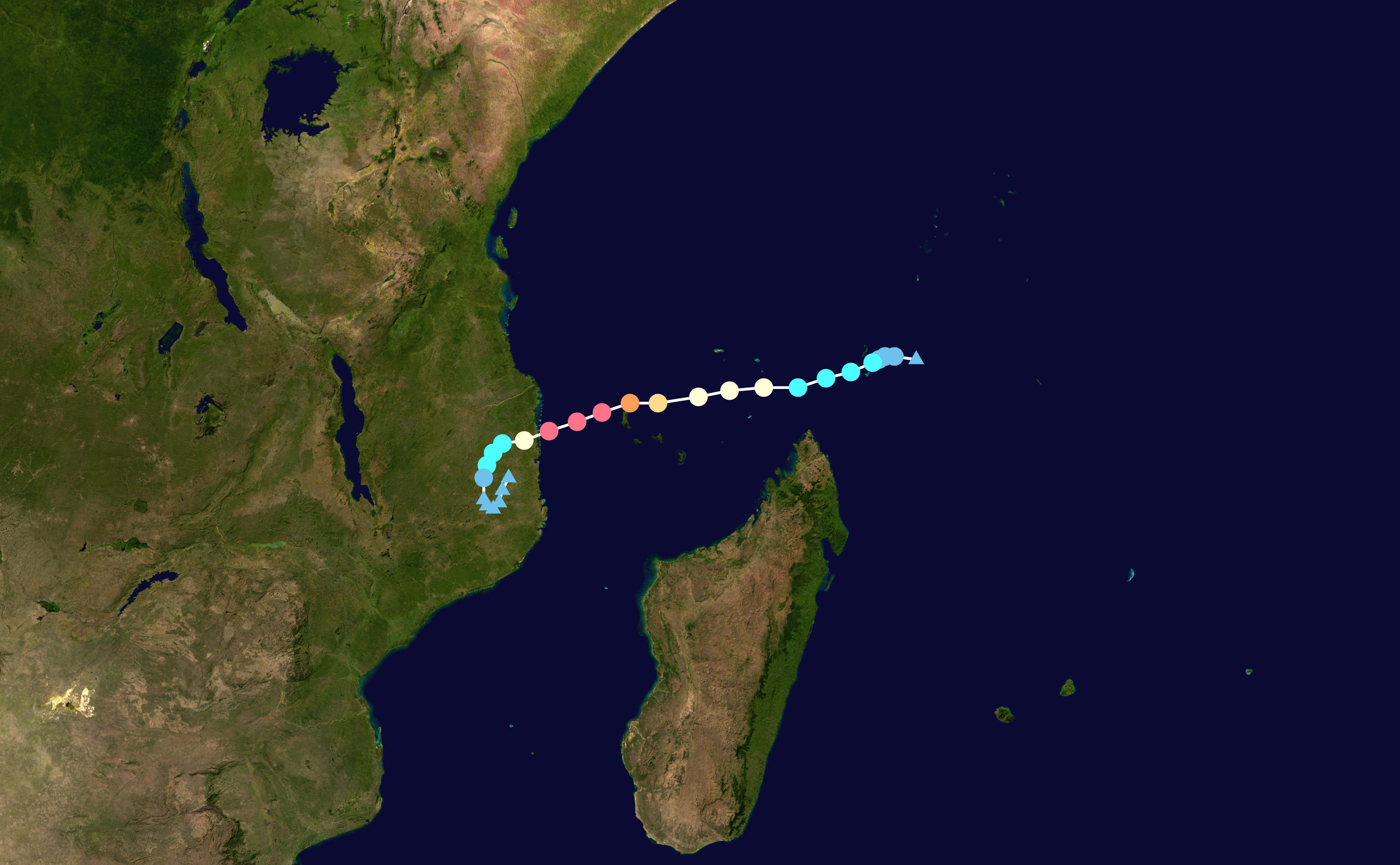
- Duration: 22 April – 27 April
- Peak intensity: 215 km/h (130 mph) (10-min); 930 hPa (mbar)

On 21 April, Météo-France (MFR) initiated advisories on Tropical Disturbance 14, which was situated to the northeast of Madagascar. The system drifted westward, organizing as it did so. Early on 23 April, the system strengthened into a tropical depression. Later that day, at 12:00 UTC, the tropical depression strengthened into a moderate tropical storm as was named Kenneth, becoming the fourteenth tropical storm of the season. Early on 24 April, Kenneth strengthened into a tropical cyclone. Kenneth rapidly organised while approaching Mozambique, reaching Category 3-equivalent tropical cyclone intensity within several hours. On the same day, Kenneth was projected to strike Mozambique within a day and bring more flooding and wind damage to the nation, about a month after Cyclone Idai had devastated the region, raising fears that the ongoing humanitarian crisis there could be worsened by the storm. On the next day, Kenneth reached its peak intensity, becoming a Category 4-equivalent intense tropical cyclone, as the storm began to near landfall in Mozambique. However, at about that time, Kenneth initiated an eyewall replacement cycle and gradually began to weaken, just prior to landfall. Later that day, at 18:15 UTC, Kenneth made landfall as a Category 4-equivalent intense tropical cyclone in Mozambique, with 1-minute sustained winds of 220 km/h (135 mph), just north of Pemba. This made Kenneth the most intense landfalling storm in Mozambique's recorded history. Kenneth's landfall also marked the second time in Mozambique's recorded history in which two storms have made landfall during the same season at tropical cyclone intensity or higher.

Kenneth underwent extremely rapid weakening upon making landfall, despite the relatively favorable atmospheric environment and flat terrain of northern Mozambique. The system's maximum ten-minute sustained winds decreased from 205 km/h (125 mph) to just 65 km/h (40 mph) in just ten hours after landfall, weakening the storm to tropical storm intensity. On 26 April, Kenneth weakened to tropical depression intensity, while continuing its southward motion. On 27 April, Kenneth began drifting northward, also developing some thunderstorms off the coast of Mozambique. Kenneth continued to weaken, dissipating by 12:00 UTC on 29 April.

Kenneth killed at least 52 people; seven on the island of Comoros, and at least 45 people in Mozambique. In Mozambique, Kenneth caused widespread damage in the city of Pemba, including extensive power outages and numerous felled trees. Kenneth is estimated to have caused at least $345 million in damages.

=== Tropical Cyclone Lorna ===
- Tropical cyclone (MFR)
- Category 2 tropical cyclone (SSHWS)
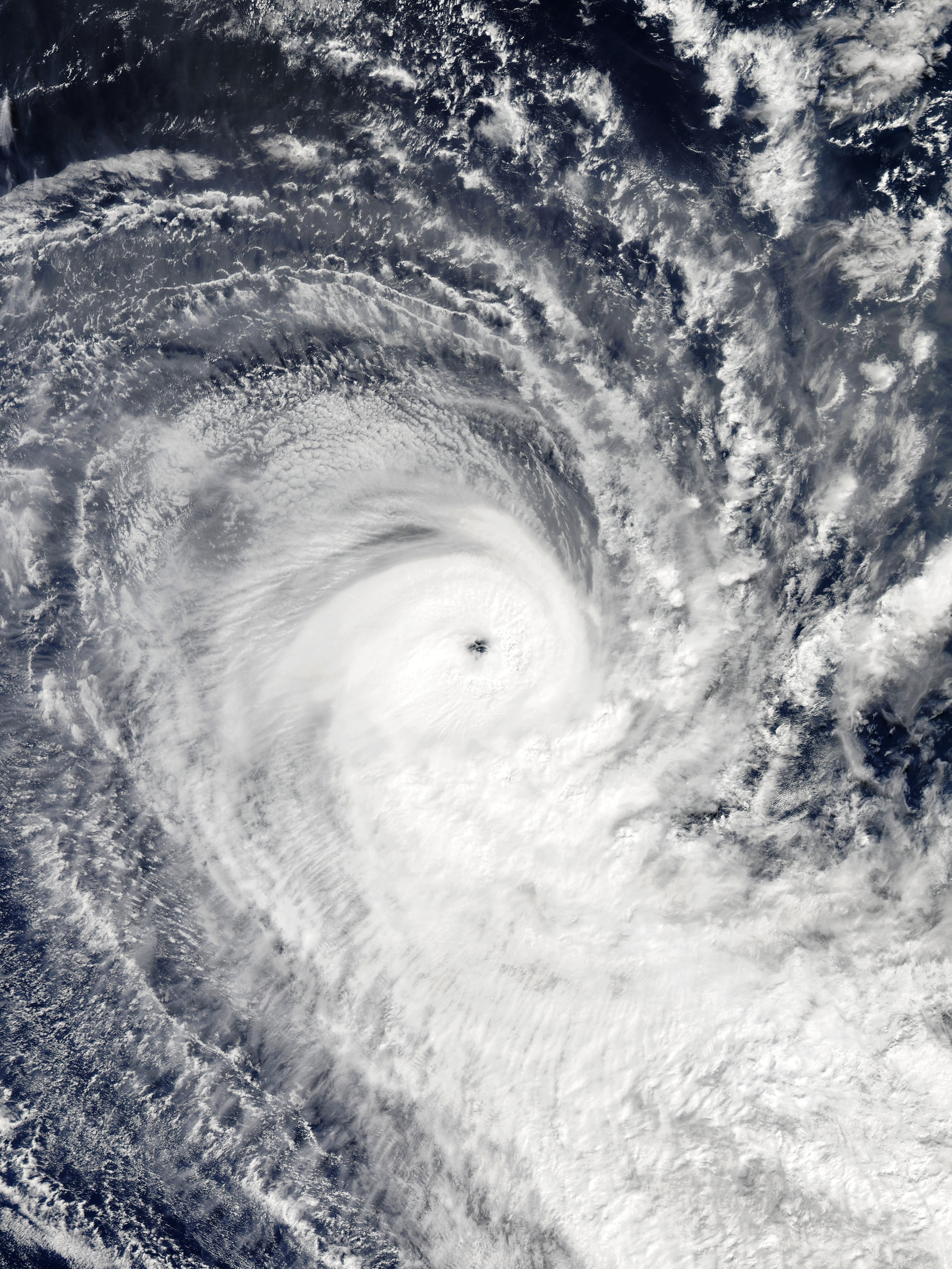
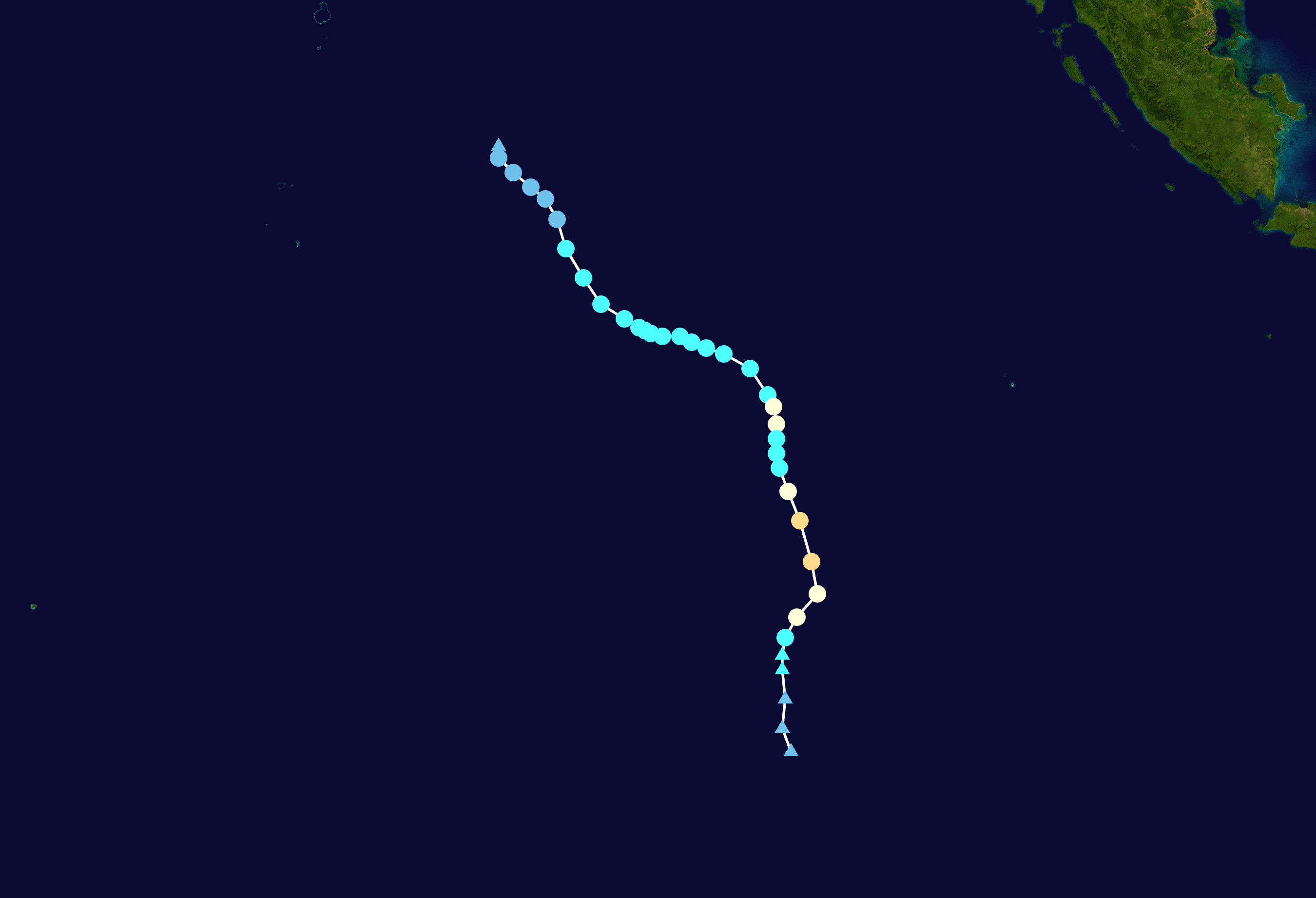
- Duration: 22 April – 29 April
- Peak intensity: 150 km/h (90 mph) (10-min); 960 hPa (mbar)

On 21 April, Tropical Depression 15 formed to the southeast of the Maldives. The system moved southeastward, before turning south-southeastward on 22 April, while slowly strengthening. On the next day, the system intensified into Moderate Tropical Storm Lorna, making the 2018–19 season the most active cyclone season recorded in the South-West Indian Ocean in the satellite era, surpassing the previous record set by the 1993–94 season. Lorna resumed a southeasterly direction on 24 April, while continuing to organise. On 25 April, Lorna then intensified into a severe tropical storm. On the same day, Lorna began to interact with a smaller tropical low to the east, in the Australian region basin, before absorbing the weaker system early on the next day. On 26 April, the JTWC upgraded Lorna to Category 1 status, while Lorna began turning towards the south. Soon afterward, Lorna encountered relatively strong vertical wind shear and steadily decreasing sea temperatures as it continued to track southwards, causing its gradual intensification trend to halt, and the JTWC to downgrade the system to a high-end tropical storm.

On 28 April, somewhat unexpectedly, and contradicting forecasts by MFR and the JTWC, the system developed a clearly defined eye and underwent steady intensification. Consequently, MFR upgraded the system to a tropical cyclone, and the JTWC upgraded Lorna to Category 2 status on the Saffir–Simpson scale. Around this time, Lorna deviated from its predominantly southwards motion, and assumed a track to the south-southeast. Due to the system being located on the very eastern edge of the South-West Indian Ocean basin during the previous two days, this slight easterly motion caused the cyclone to become centred directly over the 90th meridian east—the boundary of the Australian Bureau of Meteorology's area of responsibility. Lorna strengthened to peak intensity while tracking southwards along the boundary between the two regions, attaining ten-minute sustained winds of 150 km/h (95 mph) by 18:00 UTC on 28 April.

By 29 April, the structure of the cyclone had degraded significantly, primarily due to strong vertical wind shear and resulting dry air intrusion. As a result, the system was downgraded by the MFR to a severe tropical storm. Very strong vertical wind shear, analysed at 40 knots (74 km/h; 46 mph) at 09:00 UTC on 29 April, caused Lorna to become devoid of deep convection later that day. Having lost tropical characteristics, the system was downgraded by the MFR at 12:00 UTC to a powerful storm-force post-tropical depression. Gale-force winds ceased by 12:00 UTC on 30 April, and Ex-Tropical Cyclone Lorna exited the basin into the Australian region by 06:00 UTC on 1 May. Soon afterward, Lorna became an extratropical low, before merging with another low-pressure system in the central southern Indian Ocean later that day.

== Storm names ==
Within the South-West Indian Ocean, tropical depressions and subtropical depressions that are judged to have 10-minute sustained windspeeds of 65 km/h (40 mph) by the Regional Specialised Meteorological Centre on La Réunion Island, France (RSMC La Réunion) are usually assigned a name. However, it is the Sub-Regional Tropical Cyclone Advisory Centres in Mauritius and Madagascar who name the systems. The Sub-Regional Tropical Cyclone Advisory Centre in Mauritius names a storm should it intensify into a moderate tropical storm between 55°E and 90°E. If instead a cyclone intensifies into a moderate tropical storm between 30°E and 55°E then the Sub-Regional Tropical Cyclone Advisory Centre in Madagascar assigns the appropriate name to the storm. Storm names are taken from three pre-determined lists of names, which rotate on a triennial basis, with any names that have been used automatically removed. Therefore, all storm names used this year were later removed from the rotation and replaced with a new name for the 2021–22 season, while the unused names remained on the list.

- Alcide
- Bouchra
- Cilida
- Desmond
- Eketsang
- Funani
- Gelena
- Haleh
- Idai
- Joaninha
- Kenneth
- Lorna
- Maipelo (unused)
- Njazi (unused)
- Oscar (unused)
- Pamela (unused)
- Quentin (unused)
- Rajab (unused)
- Savana (unused)
- Themba (unused)
- Uyapo (unused)
- Viviane (unused)
- Walter (unused)
- Xangy (unused)
- Yemurai (unused)
- Zanele (unused)

If a tropical cyclone enters the South-West Indian basin from the Australian region basin (west of 90°E), it will retain the name assigned to it by the Bureau of Meteorology (BoM) or the Meteorology, Climatology, and Geophysical Agency (BMKG). The following storms were named in this manner:

- Kenanga
- Savannah

After the season, the twelve names used were automatically retired and were replaced with Ana, Batsirai, Cliff, Dumako, Emnati, Fezile, Gombe, Halima, Issa, Jasmine, Karim and Letlama, respectively for the 2021–22 season.

== Seasonal effects ==
This table lists all of the tropical cyclones and subtropical cyclones that were monitored during the 2018–2019 South-West Indian Ocean cyclone season. Information on their intensity, duration, name, areas affected, primarily comes from RSMC La Réunion. Death and damage reports come from either press reports or the relevant national disaster management agency while the damage totals are given in 2018 or 2019 USD.

Name	Dates	Peak intensity			Areas affected	Damage (USD)	Deaths	Ref(s).
Name	Dates	Category	Wind speed	Pressure	Areas affected	Damage (USD)	Deaths	Ref(s).
One	14–17 September	Moderate tropical storm	75 km/h (45 mph)	995 hPa (29.38 inHg)	None	None	None	
Alcide	5–11 November	Intense tropical cyclone	185 km/h (115 mph)	960 hPa (28.35 inHg)	Agaléga, Madagascar, Tanzania	Unknown	None	
Bouchra	10–20 November	Severe tropical storm	100 km/h (65 mph)	987 hPa (29.15 inHg)	None	None	None	
Kenanga	16–22 December	Intense tropical cyclone	185 km/h (115 mph)	955 hPa (28.20 inHg)	None	None	None	
Cilida	18–24 December	Intense tropical cyclone	215 km/h (130 mph)	947 hPa (27.96 inHg)	Mauritius	Minimal	None	
Desmond	18–22 January	Moderate tropical storm	80 km/h (50 mph)	995 hPa (29.38 inHg)	Mozambique, Madagascar	Unknown	3	
Eketsang	23–25 January	Moderate tropical storm	65 km/h (40 mph)	995 hPa (29.38 inHg)	Madagascar	Unknown	27	
Funani	4–9 February	Intense tropical cyclone	175 km/h (110 mph)	943 hPa (27.85 inHg)	Rodrigues	Minimal	None	
Gelena	5–14 February	Intense tropical cyclone	205 km/h (125 mph)	938 hPa (27.70 inHg)	Madagascar, Mauritius, Rodrigues	$1 million	None	
Haleh	1–7 March	Intense tropical cyclone	185 km/h (115 mph)	943 hPa (27.85 inHg)	None	None	None	
Idai	4–15 March	Intense tropical cyclone	185 km/h (115 mph)	942 hPa (27.82 inHg)	Mozambique, Malawi, Madagascar, Zimbabwe	$3.3 billion	1,593	
Savannah	18–19 March	Tropical cyclone	125 km/h (80 mph)	978 hPa (28.88 inHg)	None	None	None	
Joaninha	21–30 March	Intense tropical cyclone	185 km/h (115 mph)	930 hPa (27.46 inHg)	Rodrigues	Unknown	None	
Kenneth	22–27 April	Intense tropical cyclone	215 km/h (130 mph)	930 hPa (27.46 inHg)	Seychelles, Madagascar, Comoros, Mozambique, Tanzania, Malawi	$345 million	52	
Lorna	22–29 April	Tropical cyclone	150 km/h (90 mph)	960 hPa (28.35 inHg)	None	None	None	
Season aggregates
15 systems	14 September – 29 April		215 km/h (130 mph)	930 hPa (27.46 inHg)		≥ $3.65 billion	1,675	

== See also ==
- Weather of 2018 and 2019
- Tropical cyclones in 2018 and 2019
- List of Southern Hemisphere cyclone seasons
- Atlantic hurricane seasons: 2018, 2019
- Pacific hurricane seasons: 2018, 2019
- Pacific typhoon seasons: 2018, 2019
- North Indian Ocean cyclone seasons: 2018, 2019
- 2018–19 Australian region cyclone season
- 2018–19 South Pacific cyclone season
- 1999–2000 South-West Indian Ocean cyclone season – The third-deadliest South-West Indian Ocean cyclone season
