= Cyclone Fytia =

South-West Indian Ocean cyclone in 2026

Tropical Cyclone Fytia
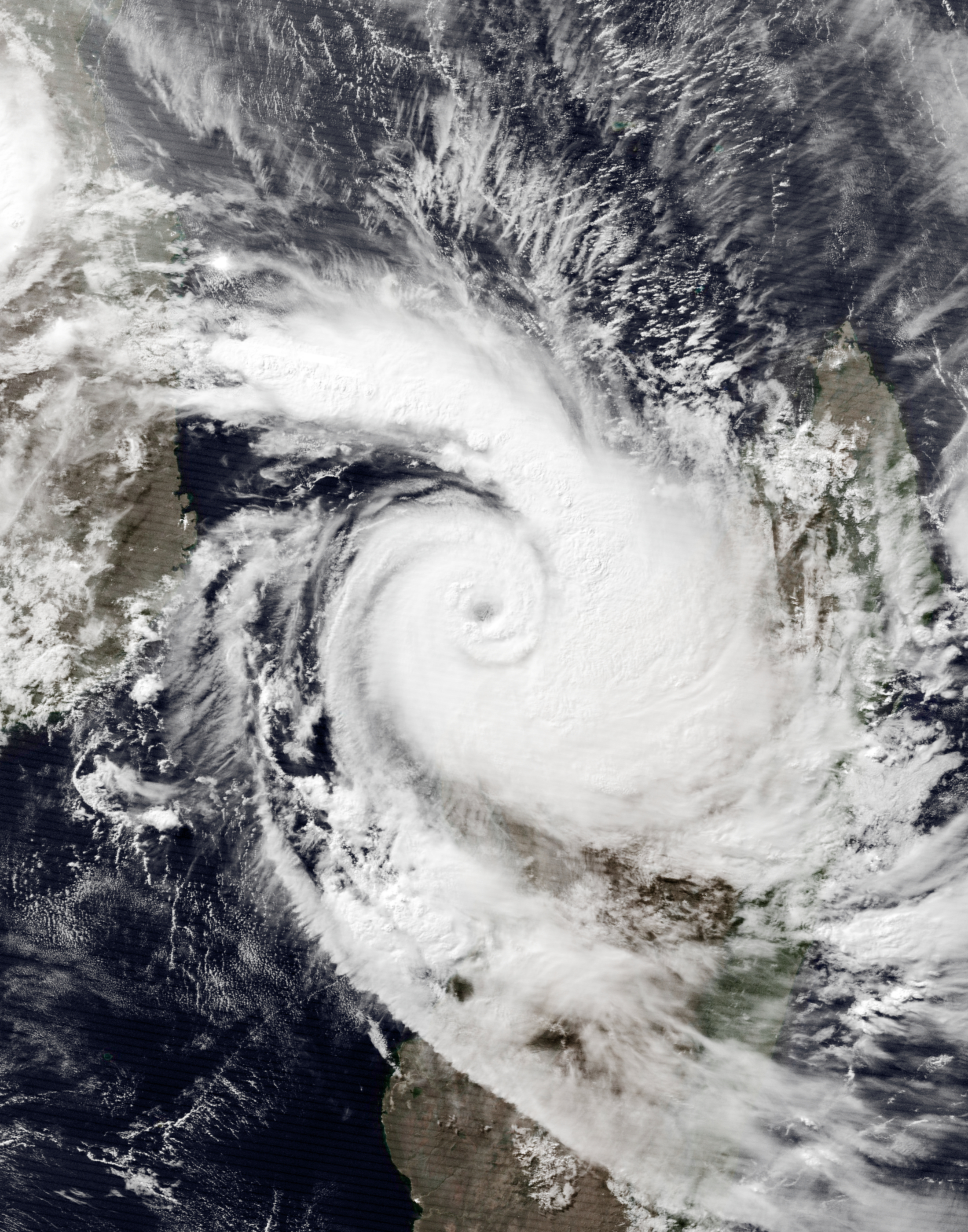
- Fytia making landfall in Madagascar at peak intensity on 31 January

Meteorological history
- Formed: 29 January 2026
- Remnant low: 4 February 2026
- Dissipated: 7 February 2026

Tropical cyclone
- 10-minute sustained (MFR)
- Highest winds: 155 km/h (100 mph)
- Lowest pressure: 960 hPa (mbar); 28.35 inHg

Category 3-equivalent tropical cyclone
- 1-minute sustained (SSHWS/JTWC)
- Highest winds: 185 km/h (115 mph)
- Lowest pressure: 962 hPa (mbar); 28.41 inHg

Overall effects
- Fatalities: 12
- Injuries: 7
- Damage: $475 million (2026 USD)
- Areas affected: Madagascar, Mozambique
- IBTrACS
- Part of the 2025–26 South-West Indian Ocean cyclone season

Tropical Cyclone Fytia was a strong, rapidly organizing, and deadly tropical cyclone that affected northwestern Mozambique and severely impacted portions of north-central Madagascar. The eighth depression, seventh storm, and third tropical cyclone of the 2025-26 South-West Indian Ocean cyclone season, Fytia was the strongest tropical cyclone to strike the western coast of Madagascar since Cyclone Belna in December 2019.

The cyclone formed on 29 January, where Météo France (MFR) had designated the system Zone of Disturbed Weather 09 a day prior. The disturbance would begin to consolidate thereafter, and MFR promptly upgraded it to a moderate tropical storm, giving it the name Fytia on 30 January. Shortly after its nomenclature, Fytia began an episode of rapid intensification, becoming a tropical cyclone after 12 hours. Early the next day, the cyclone would make landfall near Baie de Baly National Park at its peak intensity of 155 km/h (100 mph) 10-minute maximum sustained winds (equivalent to a low-end Category 3 tropical cyclone on the Saffir-Simpson scale), and a minimum pressure of 965 millibars. The cyclone would continue tracking southeastwards throughout Madagascar whilst rapidly weakening. However, after re-emerging over the open Indian Ocean, Fytia began to slightly strengthen once more on 2 February. This short window of intensification ended quickly, with the system disorganizing the following day, and promptly degenerating into a remnant low later that day.

Overall, Cyclone Fytia's impacts on Madagascar were significant. The storm left seven people injured and twelve people have been found dead. Significant flooding considerably damaged northern parts of the island, destroying thousands of homes and affecting one way or another more than 78,000 people, including nearly 40,000 rendered homeless.

== Meteorological history ==
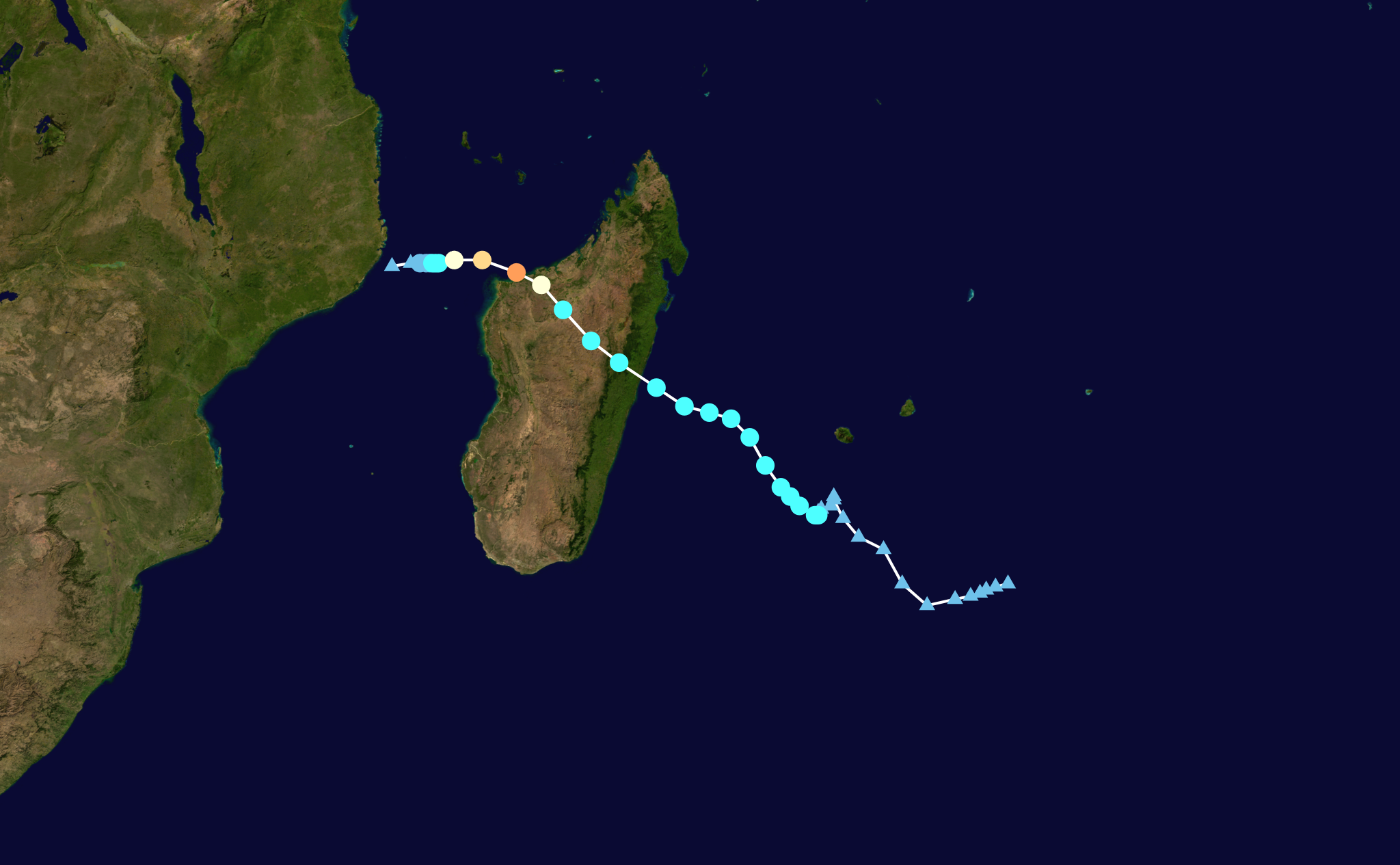
Map plotting the storm's track and intensity, according to the Saffir–Simpson scale Map key Saffir–Simpson scale Tropical depression (≤38 mph, ≤62 km/h) Tropical storm (39–73 mph, 63–118 km/h) Category 1 (74–95 mph, 119–153 km/h) Category 2 (96–110 mph, 154–177 km/h) Category 3 (111–129 mph, 178–208 km/h) Category 4 (130–156 mph, 209–251 km/h) Category 5 (≥157 mph, ≥252 km/h) Unknown Storm type Tropical cyclone Subtropical cyclone Extratropical cyclone, remnant low, tropical disturbance, or monsoon depression

On 28 January, RSMC La Réunion (Météo-France) began tracking an area of low pressure, designated as Zone of Disturbed Weather 09, located in the Mozambique Channel. The system formed along a convergence zone between the Comoros and the northwest coast of Madagascar over very warm waters with light wind shear. The disturbance was relatively shallow with a disorganized cloud pattern, a peak 10-minute sustained winds of 45 km/h (30 mph) and a minimum central pressure of 1009 millibars. On 30 January, Météo France upgraded the disturbance to a moderate tropical storm and the Madagascar Meteorological Services gave it the name Fytia. Over the next 24 hours, Fytia would experience an extreme case of rapid intensification, reaching its peak intensity of 85 knots (157 km/h) in 10-minute sustained winds, and a minimum pressure of 965 hPa (mbar). It occurred at the same time that Fytia would make landfall in northwestern Madagascar shortly after 1:30 UTC on January 31 on the coast of Mahajanga Province, just east of Cap Saint-André near the towns of Maroalika and Soalala, the same area where Cyclone Belna struck in December 2019. Its intensity was equivalent to a Category 3 hurricane on the Saffir-Simpson scale, according to the Joint Typhoon Warning Center (JTWC), making it the most powerful storm to hit the province since Cyclone Andry in 1983, and slightly stronger than Belna.

The system then rapidly weakened as it moved southeast over the mountains, eventually becoming a tropical depression near Moramanga in the southern part of Toamasina Province at 0:00 UTC on February 1. It re-emerged over the sea a few hours later, about 100 kilometers south of Toamasina, and by 12:00 UTC had regained strength as a moderate tropical storm. Fytia passed about 250 km southwest of Reunion Island on February 2nd and 3rd as a severe tropical storm. Strengthening upper-level wind shear and dry air intrusions at mid-latitudes led to weakening, and on February 4th, the system became a remnant low that was absorbed into an extratropical trough in the following days in the mid-latitudes. The system was last traceable approximately 500 kilometers south of Mauritius.

== Preparations and impact ==
Costliest South-West Indian Ocean tropical cyclones
| Rank | Tropical cyclones | Season | Damage |
|---|---|---|---|
| 1 | 5 Chido | 2024–25 | $3.9 billion |
| 2 | 4 Idai | 2018–19 | $3.3 billion |
| 3 | 3 Gezani | 2025–26 | $2 billion |
| 4 | 5 Freddy | 2022–23 | $1.53 billion |
| 5 | 3 Garance | 2024–25 | $1.05 billion |
| 6 | 3 Fytia | 2025–26 | $475 million |
| 7 | 4 Enawo | 2016–17 | $400 million |
| 8 | 4 Kenneth | 2018–19 | $345 million |
| 9 | 4 Leon–Eline | 1999–00 | $309 million |
| 10 | 4 Dina | 2001–02 | $287 million |

=== Comores and Mayotte ===
With the outer bands of the cyclone affecting Mayotte, the island was placed on yellow alert for heavy rain, strong winds and coastal flooding on 30 January. The next day, according to reports on X, winds tore down fences and rain caused rivers to overflow in Mayotte. The Journal de Mayotte confirmed that the damage remained limited, with gusts reaching only 60 to 70 km/h. They tore off some corrugated iron sheet roofs and kept fishermen in port.

=== Reunion Island ===
On 1 February^{st}, Reunion Island was placed on yellow alert for the effects of cyclonic swell, winds and rain from the outer bands of Fytia. The following day, media outlets reported flooded roads due to thunderstorms in the outer bands of the severe tropical storm Fytia on the west coast of the island, where 53 millimetres (2.1 in) of rain were recorded in Bois de Nèfles Saint-Paul and 44 millimetres (1.7 in) in Petite France in a short period. Météo-France recorded gusts of up to 97 kilometres per hour (60 mph) at Piton Maïdo and 82 kilometres per hour (51 mph) at Les Colimaçons.

=== Madagascar ===
Rainfall totals, trajectory and impact assessment of Cyclone "Fytia" as of 4 February according to ECHO.

On 29 January, the Mahajanga Province in Madagascar, was placed on cyclonic alert Authorities conducted then proactive evacuations in flood-prone localities, including the fokontany of Tsararano in that province, relocating affected households to temporary accommodation sites with essential services.

The regions of Boeny, northern Melaky, and western Betsiboka, including the city of Majunga, were directly hit by the cyclone, and many neighborhoods were flooded, sweeping away vehicles and causing significant damage, according to L'Express de Madagascar. Boats were mobilized to rescue residents of low-lying areas. Cyclone Fytia had significant humanitarian and infrastructural impacts across Madagascar after making landfall. The storm brought heavy rainfall, strong winds, and widespread flooding, particularly affecting the northwestern and central regions of the country.

Seven people were injured and twelve fatalities were reported, including one person who was reported missing in the immediate aftermath of the cyclone, who was later found dead. Of those, three deaths were reported in house collapses in the commune of Beronono, and another in the rural commune of Antanetibe in the district of Anjozorobe. One person died in Andohamandry following the collapse of their house, and another in the collapse of a retaining wall in the second district of Antananarivo. Two children, aged 5 and 8, died in the commune of Soalala (Soalala District), the first killed by a falling tree and the second when their house collapsed. In the same district, a 15-year-old girl died in Amboroka and a 20-year-old girl in Ambolombozy.

By 5 February, the National Office for Risk and Disaster Management (BNGRC) has opened 57 shelters. Material damage was significant, with 13,514 houses flooded, including 2,211 damaged and nearly 1,950 destroyed. More than one hundred classrooms were damaged or have lost their roofs, and 54 others are completely destroyed. Numerous road infrastructures have also been destroyed due to the heavy rains. The number of people affected directly was 78,376 of which 31,480 had to move to shelters Certain estimates suggest that over 164,000 to 200,000 people across dozens of districts were at risk of experiencing some level of impact from the storm.

Flooding and strong winds caused the significant damage to infrastructure, including roads, and healthcare facilities, disrupting transportation and access to essential services. Entire communities were temporarily isolated due to impassable roads and damaged transport networks. The cyclone severely affected agriculture, particularly rice production, with thousands of hectares of farmland flooded or destroyed. This raised concerns about food security and potential increases in food prices in the months following the disaster. Approximately $11 million in 2026 USD was required in humanitarian relief funds.

As of March 6, 2026, economic losses amounted to at least US$475 million.

=== Mozambique ===
In Nampula Province, heavy rains may have brought accumulations of 100 to 150 mm in 24 hours along the coast.

== International aid ==
On 10 February, the United Nations Central Emergency Response Fund (CERF) released $2 million for an emergency response to provide food, agricultural inputs, clean water, healthcare, emergency shelter, educational support, and essential household items to communities in the districts of Soalala and Marovoay of Madasgascar.

On 20 February, the UN and its humanitarian partners launched an emergency appeal for US$67.8 million to provide life-saving assistance to victims of the devastating cyclones Fytia and Gezani that struck Madagascar.

== See also ==
- Weather of 2026
- Tropical cyclones in 2026
- 2026 in Madagascar
