= Cyclone Dina =

South-West Indian cyclone in 2002

Intense Tropical Cyclone Dina
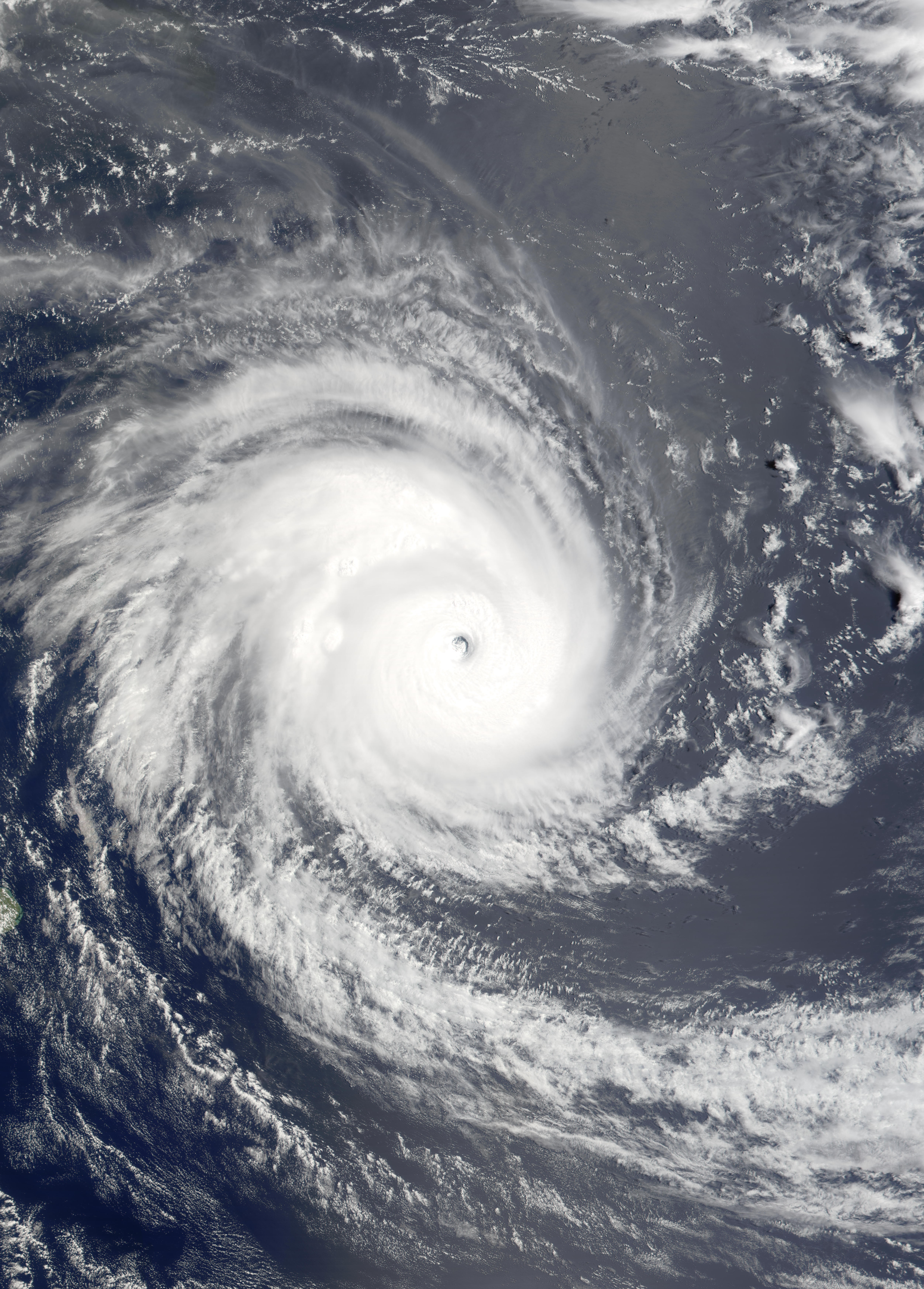
- Tropical Cyclone Dina at peak intensity on January 20

Meteorological history
- Formed: January 17, 2002
- Extratropical: January 25, 2002
- Dissipated: January 28, 2002

Intense tropical cyclone
- 10-minute sustained (MFR)
- Highest winds: 215 km/h (130 mph)
- Lowest pressure: 910 hPa (mbar); 26.87 inHg

Category 4-equivalent tropical cyclone
- 1-minute sustained (SSHWS/JTWC)
- Highest winds: 240 km/h (150 mph)
- Lowest pressure: 910 hPa (mbar); 26.87 inHg

Overall effects
- Fatalities: 15 (Note: 5 direct, 10 indirect)
- Damage: $287 million (2002 USD)
- Areas affected: Mauritius, Réunion
- IBTrACS
- Part of the 2001–02 South-West Indian Ocean cyclone season

Intense Tropical Cyclone Dina was a cyclone that caused record flooding across parts of Réunion. Originating from a tropical disturbance on 15 January 2002 near the Chagos Archipelago, the precursor to Dina quickly developed within a region favoring tropical cyclogenesis. By January 17, the system had developed enough organized convection as it moved southwestward to be declared a tropical depression. Rapid intensification occurred shortly thereafter, with the system attaining winds in excess of 120 km/h (75 mph) on January 18. Dina achieved its peak intensity on January 20 as an intense tropical cyclone with maximum sustained winds of 215 km/h (135 mph). Hours after reaching hits strength, the storm bypassed Rodrigues Island about 150 km (95 mi) to its north. On January 21, the storm brushed Mauritius and Réunion as an intense tropical cyclone before turning southward. Once on a southward course, steady weakening ensued and the system eventually transitioned into an extratropical cyclone on January 25. The remnants of the storm accelerated southeastward and were last noted on January 28 before being absorbed into a polar trough.

Across Mauritius and Réunion, torrential rains and destructive winds from the cyclone resulted in extensive to "catastrophic" damage. The entire island of Mauritius lost power during the storm and widespread structural damage took place. Agricultural and property damage amounted to US$47 million and US$50 million respectively in the republic. Nine fatalities were attributed to the storm in Mauritius: five off the coast of Rodrigues Island and four on the main island. More extensive damage was seen on Réunion where up to 2,102 mm (82.8 in) of rain fell over three days. Record to near-record flooding destroyed many homes, washed out roads, and caused catastrophic agricultural damage. Destructive winds, measured up to 280 km/h (175 mph) also crippled communications. In all, six people died on the island and losses were estimated at €200 million (US$190 million).

== Meteorological history ==
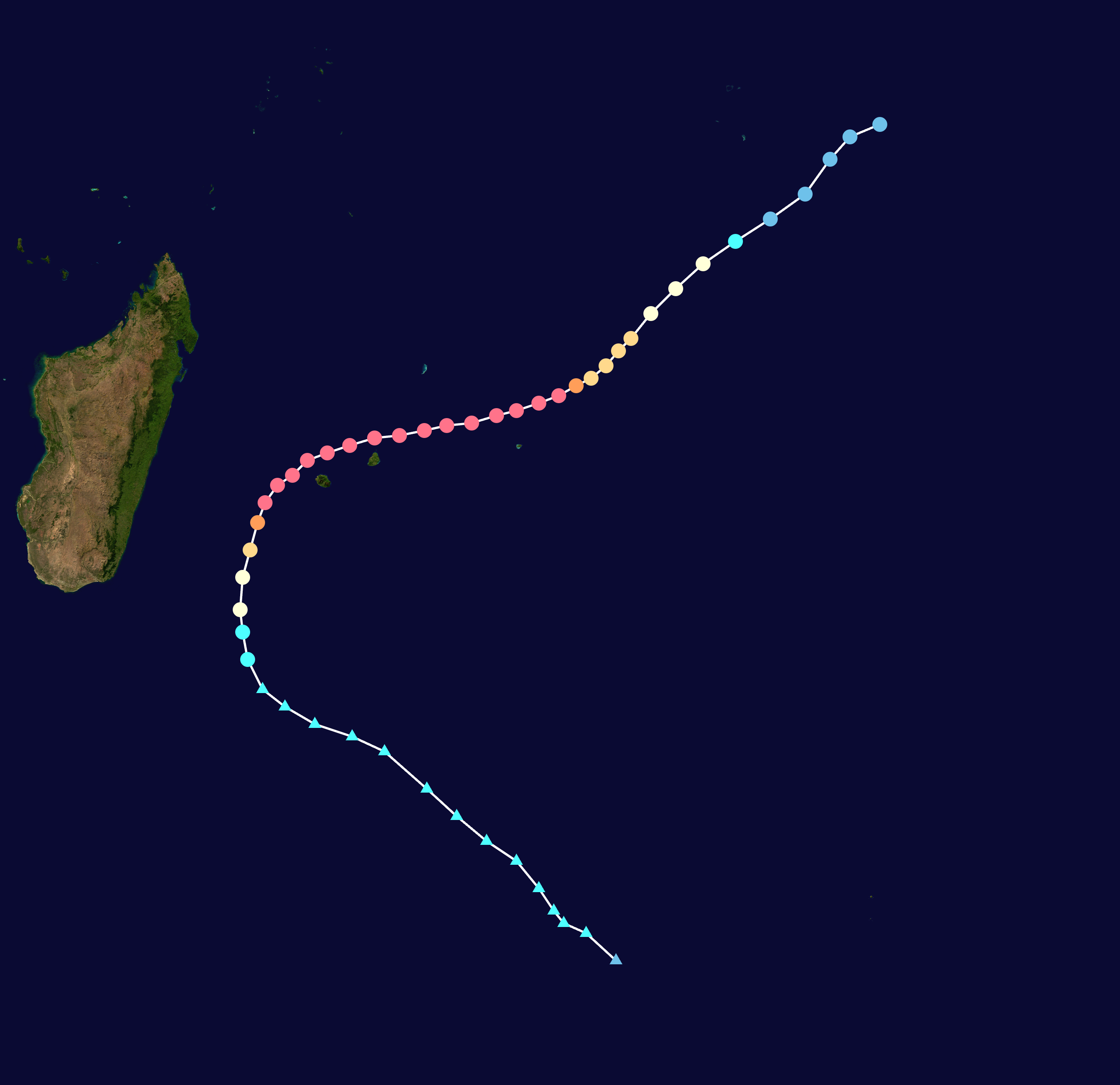
Map plotting the storm's track and intensity, according to the Saffir–Simpson scale Map key Saffir–Simpson scale Tropical depression (≤38 mph, ≤62 km/h) Tropical storm (39–73 mph, 63–118 km/h) Category 1 (74–95 mph, 119–153 km/h) Category 2 (96–110 mph, 154–177 km/h) Category 3 (111–129 mph, 178–208 km/h) Category 4 (130–156 mph, 209–251 km/h) Category 5 (≥157 mph, ≥252 km/h) Unknown Storm type Tropical cyclone Subtropical cyclone Extratropical cyclone, remnant low, tropical disturbance, or monsoon depression

On January 15, a tropical disturbance began organizing near the Chagos Archipelago in the South Indian Ocean convergence zone, which is an extended area of convection connected to the monsoon. The thunderstorms gradually organized, associated with a weak circulation and located within an area of moderate wind shear. A distinct low-pressure area developed on January 16, about 750 km (465 mi) east of Diego Garcia. The thunderstorms were primarily located along the western periphery due to continued shear, and ordinarily would prevent significant development. The system moved to the southwest along the north side of a ridge, and despite the shear it developed into a tropical disturbance late on January 16. Subsequently, the system rapidly organized, developing rainbands as the convection increased.

At 0000 UTC on January 17, Météo-France (MFR) upgraded the disturbance to a tropical depression, and six hours later upgraded the system further to Tropical Storm Dina. Shortly thereafter, the Joint Typhoon Warning Center (JTWC) issued a Tropical Cyclone Formation Alert, and later that day initiated advisories about 425 km (265 mi) south of Diego Garcia. Dina quickly intensified, and its T-numbers using the Dvorak technique increased by 0.5 every six hours during the storm's development phase. An eye began developing late on January 17, and at 1200 UTC on January 18, MFR upgraded Dina to a tropical cyclone, or the equivalent of a Category 1 hurricane on the Saffir–Simpson scale. This was only 36 hours after it was first classified as a tropical disturbance, which is much less than the five days most tropical cyclones take. About three hours earlier, the JTWC had also upgraded the storm to tropical cyclone status.

The small eye of Dina, only 20 km (10 mi) in diameter, quickly became well-defined, although it became obscured by the central dense overcast on visible satellite imagery. On January 19, the cyclone slowed as it turned to the west-southwest, after the ridge to its south intensified. The intensification rate briefly slowed, before Dina rapidly intensified late on January 19, becoming an intense tropical cyclone early the next day. Surrounded by an eyewall of deep convection, Dina intensified to reach its peak intensity on January 20. Based on satellite intensity estimates between 235 and 259 km/h (146 and 161 mph), the JTWC estimated peak one-minute sustained winds of 240 kilometres per hour (150 mph), about 205 km (125 mi) north-northeast of Rodrigues Island. At around the same time, MFR estimated peak ten-minute winds of 215 km/h (135 mph). While at its peak, Dina had a very symmetrical structure, and gusts were estimated to have reached 300 km/h (185 mph).

On January 20 while near peak intensity, Dina slowed its movement further and moved more toward the west. After previously being in the projected track of the cyclone, Rodrigues Island was bypassed by the cyclone passing about 150 km (95 mi) to its north. After passing by the island, Dina underwent an eyewall replacement cycle, which resulted in an outer eyewall forming and replacing the previous, smaller one. This resulted in the cyclone weakening slightly, although it retained much of its intensity while tracking toward Mauritius and Réunion. Late on January 21, Dina passed about 65 km (40 mi) north of Cape Malheureux in Mauritius, with 10-minute winds estimated at 185 kilometres per hour (115 mph); however, the strongest winds remained offshore. At the time, the storm's eye became asymmetric with a diameter of 85 km (55 mi). Late the next day, Dina also passed about 65 km (40 mi) off the north coast of Réunion, and although the island was in the forecast track, the cyclone accelerated to the west in the final hours and spared the island from the strongest winds. This abrupt shift in tract took place as the cyclone interacted with the high terrain of Réunion. Additionally, Doppler weather radar showed the highest reflectivity values to be 40 to 60 km (25 to 37 mi) from the center. On January 23, Dina weakened below intense tropical cyclone status while it accelerated to the southwest; the change in movement was due to the ridge moving further to the southeast. Increased wind shear due to an approaching trough contributed to the weakening, and by late on January 23 the eye dissipated. The next day, Dina weakened into a tropical storm, after the convection diminished around the center. Late on January 24, the JTWC discontinued advisories, and about 24 hours later, MFR classified Dina as an extratropical cyclone. The system accelerated to the southeast and was absorbed by a polar trough on January 28.

== Preparations, impact, and aftermath ==
=== Mauritius ===
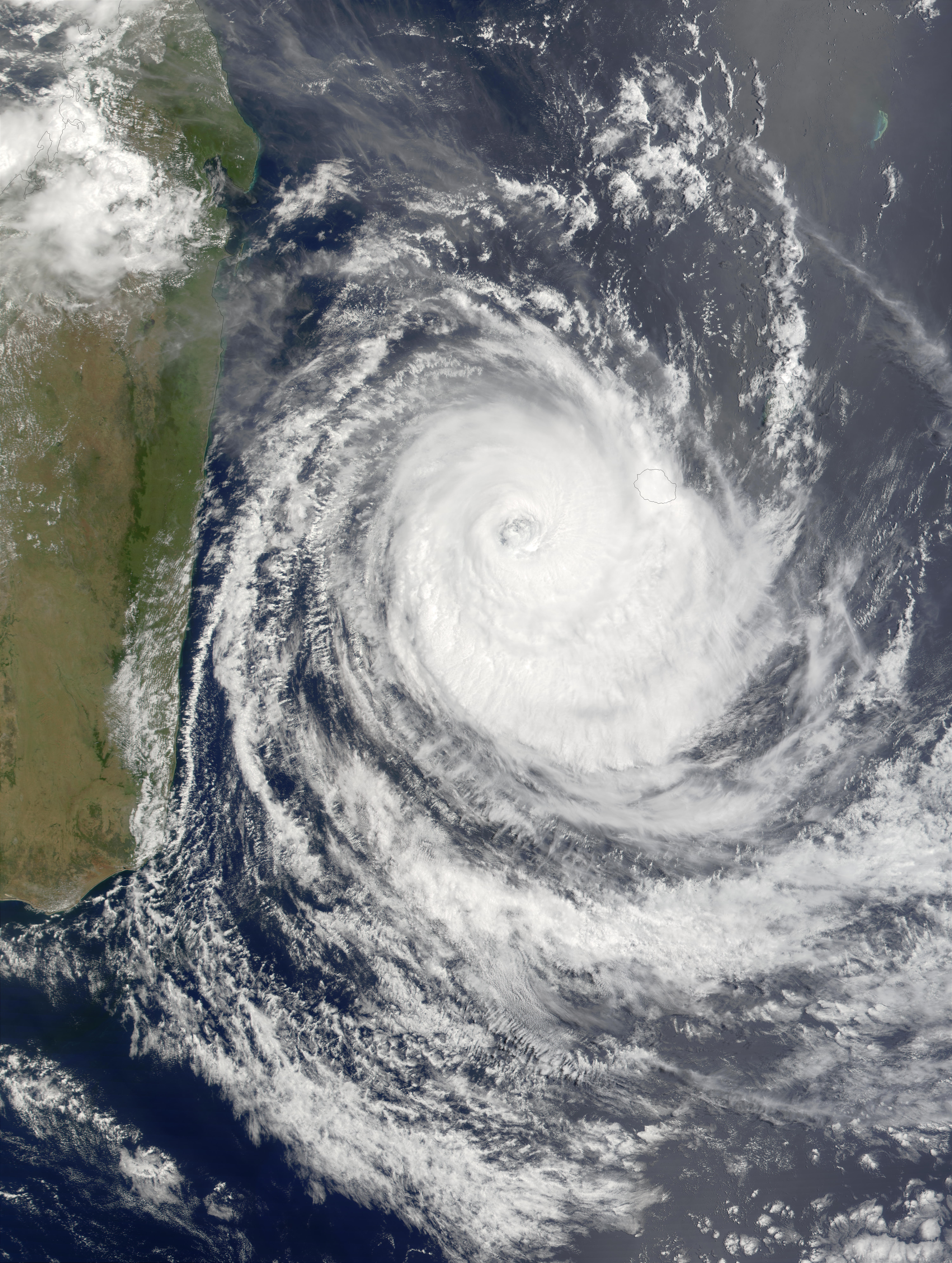
Cyclone Dina on January 23 near Réunion

Less than a day prior to Cyclone Dina's arrival in Mauritius, officials in the nation closed schools, government offices, businesses, and ports. A state of alert was issued for the entire country, meaning that those at greatest risk should seek shelter. All flights to and from the nation were canceled "until further notice." Across the island, 259 people sought refuge in shelters. According to NASA, there was potential for a 12.2 m (40 ft) storm surge as the cyclone moved over the region.

The first island to be affected by the storm was Rodrigues. There gusts reached 122 km/h (76 mph). Rainfall was light on the island, reaching 94 mm (3.7 in) at Roche Bon Dieu. The cyclone killed five fishermen offshore Rodrigues. Numerous areas across Mauritius recorded hurricane-force winds. On the republic's main island, gusts reached 230 km/h (145 mph) at Le Morne Brabant. A station near the capital city of Port Louis reported a gust of 206 km/h (128 mph). Torrential rainfall affected much of Mauritius during Dina's passage, with a maximum of 745.2 mm (29.34 in) falling in Pierrefonds. This was more than the average monthly rainfall, and most of the precipitation fell in about 24 hours. A barometric pressure of 935.9 mbar (hPa; 27.64 inHg) was recorded in Vacoas-Phoenix. Flooding and mudslides greatly disrupted the public water system, with most people losing running water.

Power and communications across Rodrigues and the island of Mauritius were crippled by the storm, with the entirety of the former and 90 percent of the latter losing electricity. For approximately ten hours, the country was cut off from the outside world, with all communications disrupted. About 50,000 of the nation's 280,000 telecommunication lines sustained serious damage, resulting in prolonged power outages. Repair crews estimated that it would take until January 27, nearly a week after the storm's passage, for power to be fully restored. Widespread areas also lost water on Mauritius. Schools across the region sustained significant damage and as a precautionary measure, all classes were canceled until January 29. Agriculture sustained considerable losses as a result of the storm. Approximately 15 metric tons of flour and 20 metric tons of rice were damaged and preliminary estimates for sugarcane losses across the island reached US$47 million. Property damage from the storm amounted to US$50 million, and there were four deaths on the island; three were caused by traffic accidents, and the other was a man who died while making storm preparations.

In the wake of the storm, a special mobile force was dispatched by officials to assist in relief operations. Red Cross distribution centers were set up on Mauritius and served food and clothing to more than 500 by January 25. Despite the severity of damage, government officials declined to appeal for international aid. Although no requests for aid were made, the Government of Norway provided US$10,000 worth of funds to the nation. Owing to the effects of Cyclone Dina and several other meteorological factors, the economy of Mauritius suffered significantly in 2002 as a whole. Annual growth dropped to about 1.9 percent from approximately 5 percent in 2001. The sugarcane industry suffered greatly from the storm, experiencing a 19.3 percent decrease.

=== Réunion ===
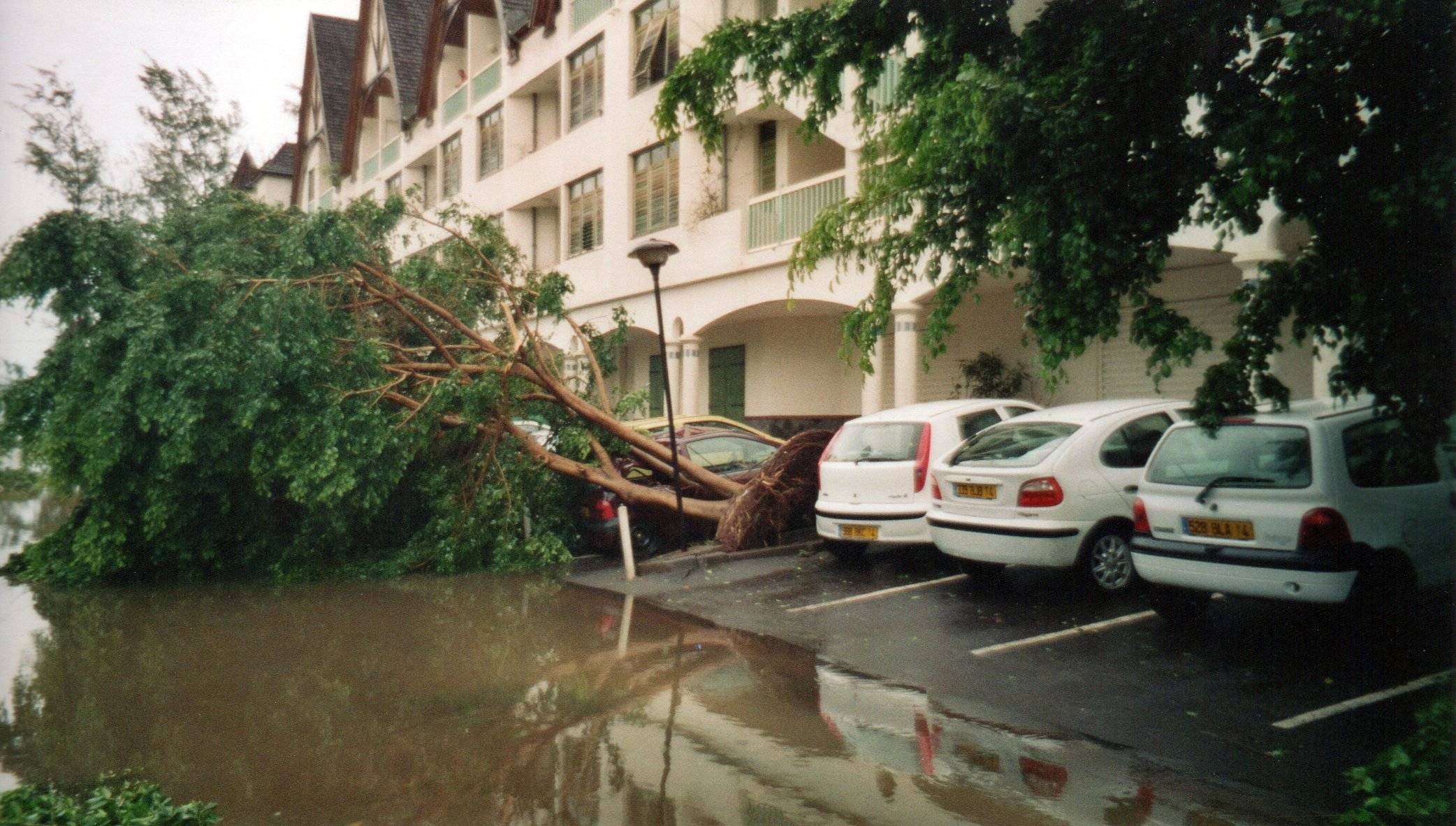
A downed tree and street flooding from the storm in Saint-Leu, Réunion.

Due to the storm's close passage to the island, much of Réunion experienced hurricane-force winds. The strongest observed gust was 280 km/h (175 mph) on Maïdo; however, based on the destruction of Météo-France's Doppler weather radar, winds could have exceeded 300 km/h (185 mph). Plaine des Cafres reported gusts of over 150 km/h (95 mph) for at least 15 hours. These winds caused extensive damage, crippling communications, devastating infrastructure, and left more than 160,000 families, about 70 percent of the island's population, without power. Some areas were without power for nine days. Additionally, about 25 percent of the island was left without running water. Damaged transmitters interrupted radio and television broadcasts for several days. In Saint-Denis, two people were seriously injured after a wall collapsed on them. Although winds were strong, the majority of damage was limited to broken windows, removed sheet metal, broken gutters, and removed siding. The most severe damage took place in exposed areas at higher elevations or where tunneling of the wind occurred.

Heavy rains produced by Dina triggered flash flooding and many landslides, further crippling travel and forcing at least 2,500 people to seek refuge in public shelters. Some areas recorded more than 400 mm (16 in) in a 24‑hour span, notably the Bellecombe resting place (a volcano lodge) which measured 953 mm (37.5 in) in 24 hours as well as a two-day total of 1,360 mm (54 in). The heaviest rainfall was measured in La Plaine des Chicots at 2,102 mm (82.8 in). With the ground already saturated from previous rain events, the torrential rains caused numerous rivers across the island to burst their banks. The Ravine des Cabris reached an all-time record flood while three other rivers reached their second-highest levels, behind the flood event caused by Cyclone Firinga in 1989. Heavy rains occurred in the typically dry western portion of the island, which resulted in significant flooding. Many ecosystems suffered from these floods with water quality greatly degraded and flow disrupted. However, in post-storm surveys in July 2002, it was found that the impact was not catastrophic and the ecosystems would eventually recover. Significant runoff also prompted fears of algae blooms that would damage coral reefs. Numerous roads were damaged or washed out by the floods, leaving approximately €42.9 million (US$37.6 million) in losses. In Lengevin village within the Saint-Joseph department, 35 families were forced to evacuate. Many landslides took place in addition to flooding, further hampering travel and isolating hundreds of residents.

Costliest South-West Indian Ocean tropical cyclones
Rank	Tropical cyclones	Season	Damage
1	4 Chido	2024–25	$3.9 billion
2	4 Idai	2018–19	$3.3 billion
3	3 Gezani	2025–26	$2 billion
4	5 Freddy	2022–23	$1.53 billion
5	3 Garance	2024–25	$1.05 billion
6	3 Fytia	2025–26	$475 million
7	4 Enawo	2016–17	$400 million
8	4 Kenneth	2018–19	$345 million
9	4 Leon–Eline	1999–00	$309 million
10	4 Dina	2001–02	$287 million

Catastrophic agricultural damage occurred across the island, with losses reaching an estimated €76 million (US$66.7 million). The entire fruit and vegetable crop was lost during the storm while the vanilla and geranium crops sustained heavy damage. Additionally, about 15–20 percent of the sugarcane crop was destroyed. Horticulture sustained about 50 percent losses; however, much of this resulted from lost work hours. Poultry farms suffered about 70 percent losses, from lost animals and destroyed buildings. Along the coast, large waves measured up to 12.47 m (40.9 ft) caused moderate damage. Additionally, an estimated storm surge of 6 to 9 m (20 to 30 ft) impacted the island. Some buildings were flooded, roads washed out, and other roads were left covered in debris.

In all, about 15,000 damage claims were filed across Réunion, with a total of 3,251 homes damaged and about 850 condemned or destroyed. Property damage from the storm amounted to €95 million (US$83.4 million). Collectively, losses on the island were estimated at €200 million (US$190 million). Although there were no fatalities directly related to the storm, six people died in various events indirectly caused by Dina.

In the wake of Cyclone Dina's devastation on January 23, then French Prime Minister Lionel Jospin ordered a relief team of 200 personnel to be dispatched to the island. He also expressed "deep personal sympathy" to the residents of Réunion. The following day, the Catholic Relief Services released immediate funds of €16,000 (US$14,000). An estimated 50,000 tonnes of debris was cleaned up across the island, the majority of which was in the Northwest Department, and cost waste management crews approximately €4.5 million (US$4 million) to process. Initially, the national disaster program was slow to react, with funding first being available on February 5. The first payments were made starting a month later. In the five months following the storm, the Government of France provided about €10.6 million (US$12 million) in aid to farmers, accounting for an overestimation of about 20 percent in needs. Based on meteorological statistics regarding wind speed and rainfall, Cyclone Dina was regarded as a 1-in-30–50 year event in Réunion.

== See also ==
- Tropical cyclones in 2002
- Weather of 2002
- Tropical cyclones in the Mascarene Islands
- 1892 Mauritius cyclone
- Cyclone Gamede
