= Cyclone Gezani =

South-West Indian Ocean cyclone in 2026

Intense Tropical Cyclone Gezani
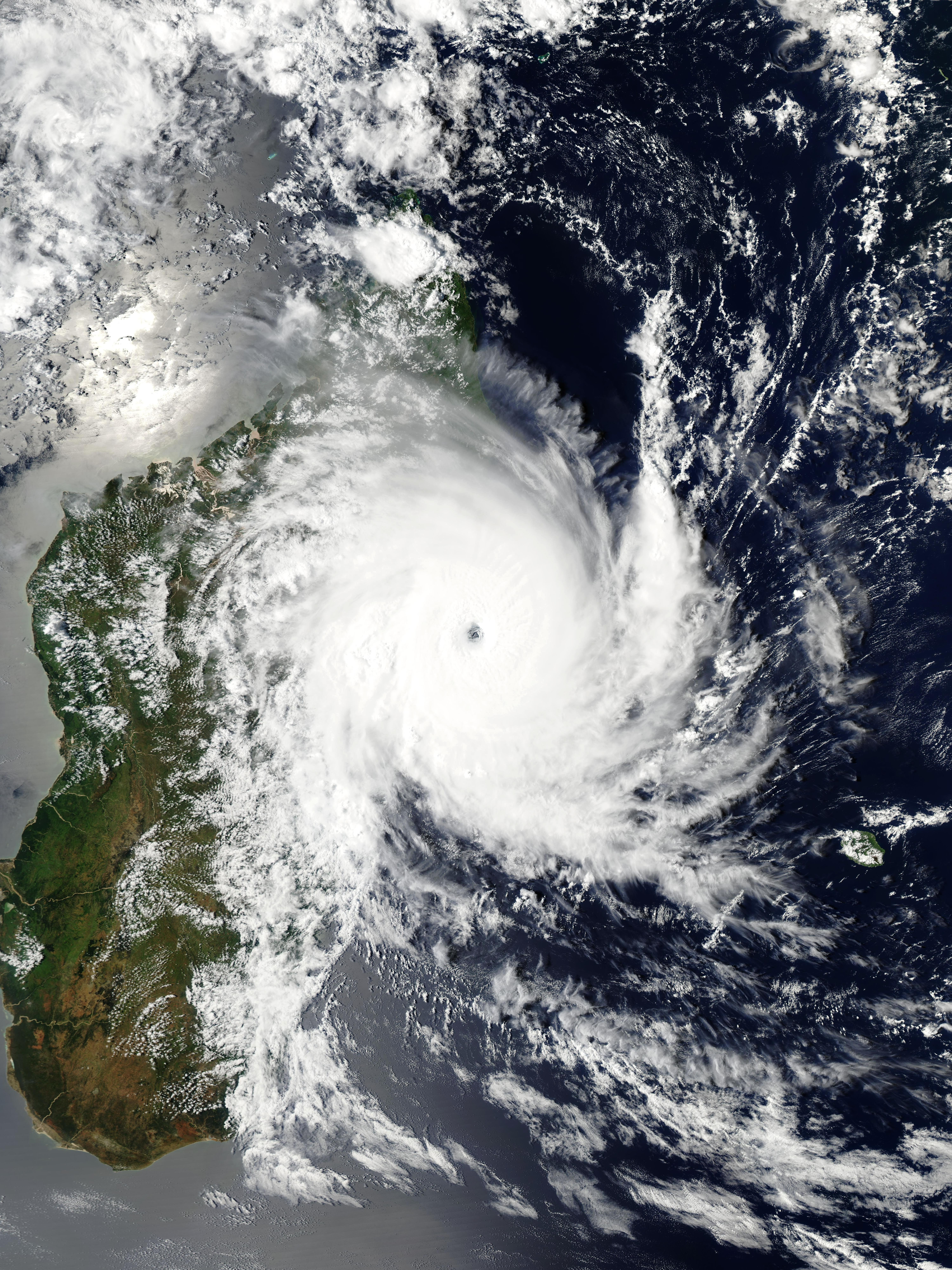
- Gezani at its peak intensity shortly before landfall in Madagascar on 10 February

Meteorological history
- Formed: 4 February 2026
- Extratropical: 18 February 2026
- Dissipated: 25 February 2026

Intense tropical cyclone
- 10-minute sustained (MFR)
- Highest winds: 195 km/h (120 mph)
- Highest gusts: 280 km/h (175 mph)
- Lowest pressure: 952 hPa (mbar); 28.11 inHg

Category 3-equivalent tropical cyclone
- 1-minute sustained (SSHWS/JTWC)
- Highest winds: 205 km/h (125 mph)
- Lowest pressure: 956 hPa (mbar); 28.23 inHg

Overall effects
- Fatalities: 63+
- Injuries: 809+
- Missing: 15+
- Damage: $2 billion (2026 USD) (Third-costliest cyclone in the South-West Indian Ocean basin; costliest in Malagasy history)
- Areas affected: St. Brandon, Mascarene Islands, Madagascar (particularly Toamasina), Southern Mozambique
- IBTrACS
- Part of the 2025–26 South-West Indian Ocean cyclone season

Intense Tropical Cyclone Gezani was a deadly, long-lived and destructive tropical cyclone that became the costliest cyclone to hit Madagascar on record, and the third-costliest cyclone in the South-West Indian Ocean. It also affected parts of St. Brandon, Mascarene Islands, and Mozambique as an intense tropical cyclone. In Madagascar, it made landfall at the city of Toamasina, the country's chief seaport. The ninth depression, eighth storm and third tropical cyclone of the 2025–26 South-West Indian Ocean cyclone season, Gezani was the strongest tropical cyclone to impact Madagascar in 2026, and the second to do so within 2 weeks' time, following Cyclone Fytia. The cyclone formed on 4 February 2026 as a tropical disturbance, and mostly meandered in the same spot for a few coming days. A while later, the storm tracked southwest at a relatively low pace. On 8 February, the disturbance was upgraded to a moderate tropical storm and was given the name Gezani. Over the next few days, the storm rapidly intensified from a moderate tropical storm to a tropical cyclone in a small 30-hour window. It made landfall in Madagascar as an intense tropical cyclone with winds of 195 km/h (121 mph) and pressure as low as 952 hPa (mbar).

Gezani left at least 63 people dead, including 59 in Madagascar, 804 others injured, and 15 missing; alongside 16,000 being displaced. The cyclone has destroyed 25,000 homes, with a further 27,000 flooded. According to the CMRS cyclone forecaster on France's Réunion island, Cyclone Gezani's landfall is likely to have been one of the most intense recorded around the city in the satellite era.

== Meteorological history ==
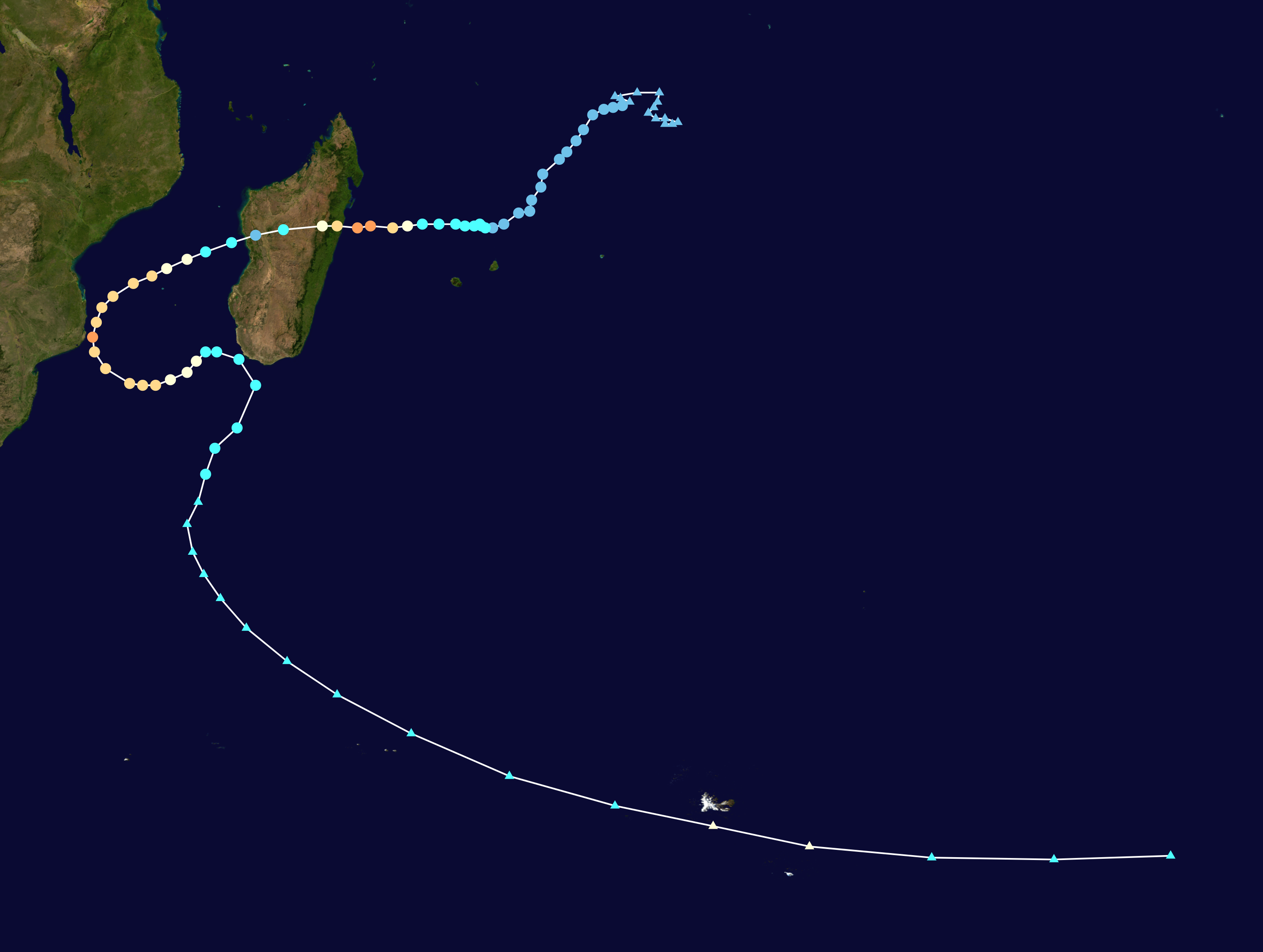
Map plotting the storm's track and intensity, according to the Saffir–Simpson scale Map key Saffir–Simpson scale Tropical depression (≤38 mph, ≤62 km/h) Tropical storm (39–73 mph, 63–118 km/h) Category 1 (74–95 mph, 119–153 km/h) Category 2 (96–110 mph, 154–177 km/h) Category 3 (111–129 mph, 178–208 km/h) Category 4 (130–156 mph, 209–251 km/h) Category 5 (≥157 mph, ≥252 km/h) Unknown Storm type Tropical cyclone Subtropical cyclone Extratropical cyclone, remnant low, tropical disturbance, or monsoon depression

On 4 February, a tropical disturbance formed 1,000 km (620 mi) northeast of Mauritius; assigned Zone of Disturbed Weather 10 by Météo-France and Tropical Disturbance 21S by the Joint Typhoon Warning Center. The disturbance proceeded to move erratically around its formation area. The disturbance then was officially recognized as a tropical depression by the JTWC. Around the same time, Météo-France also upgraded the storm from a zone of disturbed weather to a depression. The tropical depression proceeded to strengthen and move erratically towards the southwest, keeping its depression status for a distance of 900 km (560 mi). In this state, the storm averaged a movement speed of 9 km/h (5.6 mph). (Note: These distance and speed figures are an approximation. IBTrACS does not keep data for tropical depressions, and the JTWC do not archive their storm warnings.)

On 8 February, the tropical depression was officially upgraded to a moderate tropical storm by Météo-France; giving it the name Gezani. The JTWC also proceeded to classify Gezani as a tropical storm. In this state, Gezani moved 50 km (31 mi) to the southwest at a relatively slow speed of 3 km/h (1.9 mph). The strengthening tropical storm continued by moving towards Madagascar, though at a slow pace of 7 km/h (4.3 mph). (Note: This is Gezani's averaged movement speed, from when it became a tropical storm to when it made landfall.) The next day, Gezani underwent rapid intensification, intensifying from a moderate tropical storm to an intense tropical cyclone in just 24 hours. In the process, Gezani developed a well defined eye. At 12:00 UTC, Gezani reached its peak intensity, sustaining wind speeds of up to 185 km/h (115 mph) and pressure levels as low as 953 hPa (mbar) over a 10-minute period. Shortly after its peak intensity, at approximately 17:30 UTC on 10 February (7:30pm local time), Gezani made landfall near the city of Toamasina as an intense tropical cyclone, and as a high-end Category 3 on the Saffir-Simpson scale. It was reported that Gezani's storm surge was 1 m (3.3 ft) high and traveling at 250 km/h (160 mph); accompanied by 10 m (11 yd) wave heights at this stage in the storm's lifespan. Satellite imagery displayed that the eye passed right over the city.

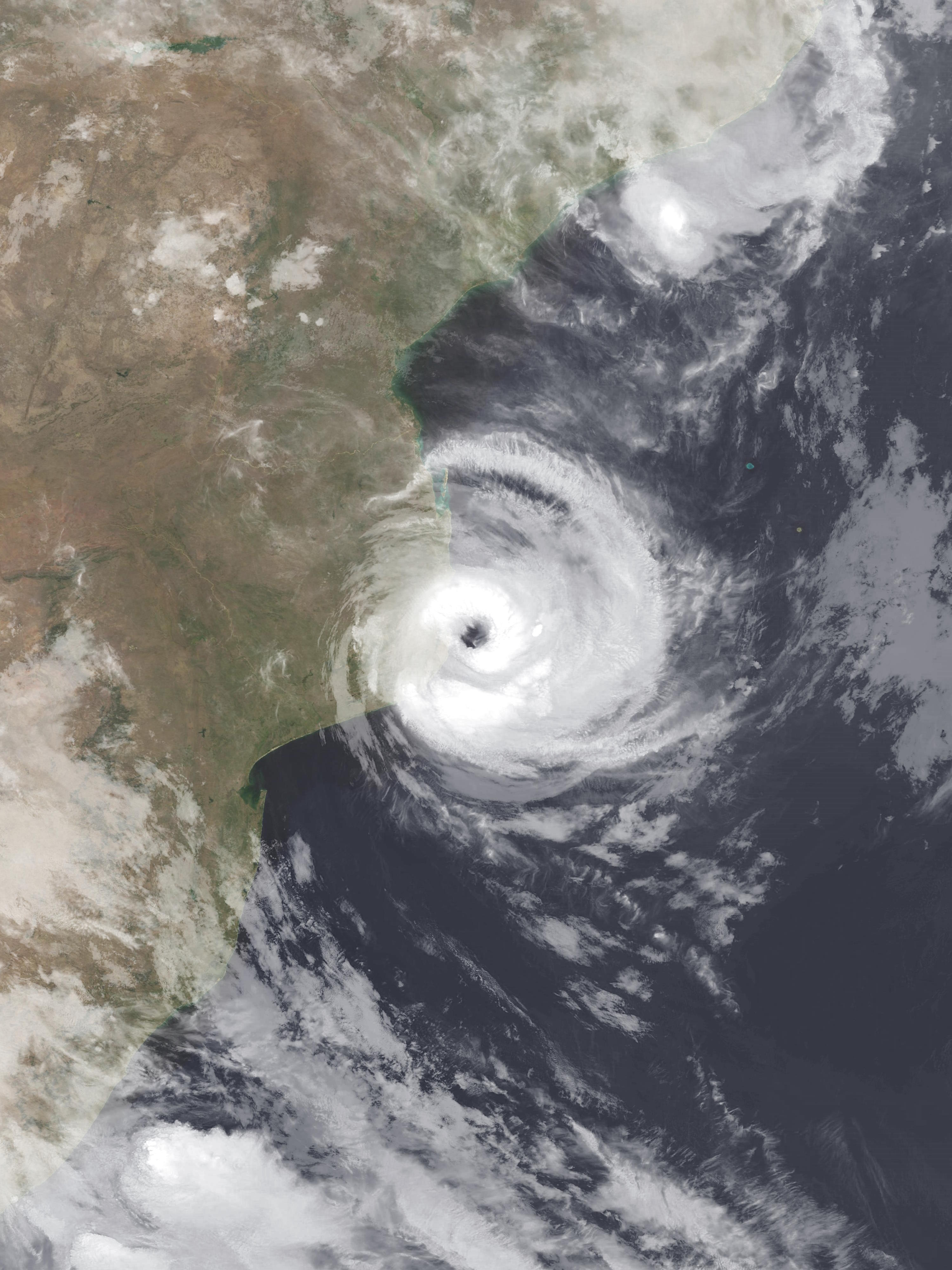
Gezani during its closest approach to Mozambique on 13 February

Following the landfall, Gezani rapidly weakened; going from an intense tropical cyclone to a severe tropical storm in a 12-hour window. That was then followed by the cyclone briefly weakening into a tropical depression (disturbance on the MFR scale.) On 11 February at 18:00 UTC, Gezani had officially crossed Madagascar and lost all of its prior strength; travelling into the Mozambique Channel at about 25 km/h (16 mph). Then, bring present in the channel, it began strengthening in the warm water whilst steadily travelling west-southwest. The strengthening process of the storm remained slow, increasing in intensity slightly at a time. On 13 February at 00:00 UTC, the storm started showing signs of gradually turning south. Gezani narrowly missed Mozambique on its way south, briefly reaching its low end Category 3 secondary peak intensity of 185 km/h (115 mph), about 60 km (37 mi) east of Inhambane. The cyclone continued turning to its left–back to the east; whilst weakening in the process. On 15 February at 00:00 UTC, the storm had completed its 180° turn to the left; continuing to weaken. This was followed by the cyclone approaching Madagascar, without making a secondary landfall. After narrowly missing Madagascar, the cyclone proceeded to turn to the south, where on the 17 February it was downgraded to a moderate tropical storm. In the process, the cyclone moved over 1000 km south from when it was near Madagasacar–where it proceeded to become a subtropical cyclone. Over the next two days, Gezani would continue to weaken, and on 25 February, Gezani dissipated.

== Preparations and impact ==
On 6 February, when the cyclone became a moderate tropical storm, The GDACS gave an overall red weather alert, expecting severe humanitarian needs following landfall. The United Nations released $3 million from its emergency response fund to help Madagascar prepare for the impacts of Gezani. The Mozambican government prepared in potential for effects, expecting it becomes a tropical cyclone in the Mozambique channel. Cyclone Gezani came 10 days after Tropical Cyclone Fytia, which killed 14 and displaced over 31,000 people.

Costliest South-West Indian Ocean tropical cyclones
Rank	Tropical cyclones	Season	Damage
1	4 Chido	2024–25	$3.9 billion
2	4 Idai	2018–19	$3.3 billion
3	3 Gezani	2025–26	$2 billion
4	5 Freddy	2022–23	$1.53 billion
5	3 Garance	2024–25	$1.05 billion
6	3 Fytia	2025–26	$475 million
7	4 Enawo	2016–17	$400 million
8	4 Kenneth	2018–19	$345 million
9	4 Leon–Eline	1999–00	$309 million
10	4 Dina	2001–02	$287 million

=== Mascarene Islands ===
Tropical Storm Gezani passed over St. Brandon and north of the main islands of the Mascarene Islands before heading towards Madagascar. In Réunion, the system made its closest approach between February 8 and 9, 2026, passing about 315 kilometres (196 mi) north of the island, bringing stronger winds, rougher seas, and more humid conditions, but no major damage was reported by local authorities. In Mauritius, the storm's influence remained very limited, as it tracked about 200 kilometres (124 mi) north-northeast of the island, with no significant disturbances observed.

=== Madagascar ===
METEOSAT-09 infrared satellite loop of Gezani making landfall in Madagascar; displaying its well defined eye

In Madagascar, a total of 59 citizens have been found or reported dead; 32 in Toamasina Province and 27 elsewhere in the country. Alongside this, 804 were found injured and 15 people were overall labeled as missing in the country. In the city of Toamasina 16,318 people were displaced from their homes alongside 269,407 classified as disaster victims in total. Toamasina also faced severe structural damage. 18,797 houses and 71 classrooms have been destroyed; as well as 51,760 houses and 561 classrooms being damaged. 104 classrooms were also labeled as being partially destroyed. Overall, 75% of buildings were considered destroyed in the city, described by the locals as monstrous damage. At one point, Toamasina was running with only 5% of electricity and no clean water.

Aon estimated that losses from Gezani totaled to US$150 million. But on March 6, 2026, economic losses where estimated to be at least US$2 billion in Madagascar alone.

=== Mozambique ===
In Inhambane, Mozambique, water services were cut off and 13,000 citizens were left without power; leaving four dead. According to the Mozambican meteorological service, gusts of 215 km/h were recorded and more than 130,000 people were left without electricity, according to the national supply company, in the surrounding region. Authorities also report 805 displaced people in 15 shelters and 6,165 people affected.

=== Elsewhere ===
The extratropical depression originating from the remnants of Gezani brought 83 millimetres (3.3 in) of rain to the Alfred-Faure base in the Crozet Islands on February 19th, followed by strong winds on the Kerguelen Islands the next day, where the Port-aux-Français base recorded a gust of 156 kilometres per hour (97 mph).

== Aftermath ==
Compounding on the impacts of Cyclone Fytia, 400,000 people overall were left in humanitarian needs. Michael Randrianirina, Madagascar's president, visited Toamasina to view the damage caused from the storm. To help with the damage, China offered ¥100 million to cleanup after the destructive cyclone, and France pledged food and rescue teams from Reunion. France donated humanitarian aid to Madagascar, which, per Joan Tilouine and Laure Verneau, was meant to counter Russian influence in Madagascar. According to the CMRS cyclone forecaster on France's Reunion island, Cyclone Gezani's landfall is likely to have been one of the most intense recorded around the city in the satellite era.

== See also ==
- 2026 in Madagascar
- Tropical cyclones in 2026
- Weather of 2026
- Tropical cyclones in Southern Africa
