= Tropical cyclones in the Comoros Islands =

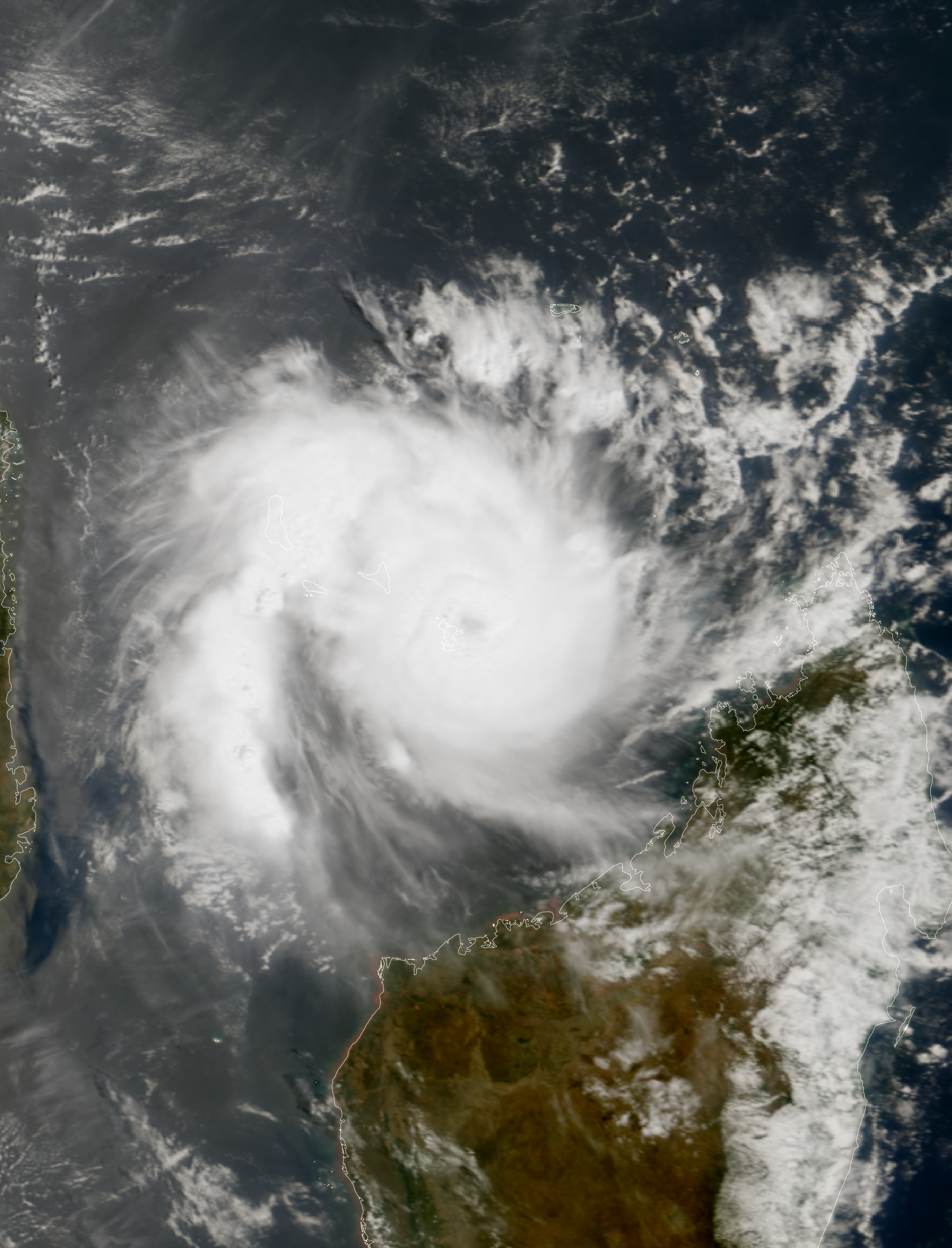
Cyclone Chido making landfall in Mayotte in December 2024

The Comoros Islands are an archipelago in the Mozambique Channel, located in the South Indian Ocean between Madagascar and southeastern Africa. The islands include the country of Comoros as well as the French overseas department of Mayotte. Since 1864, at least 27 tropical cyclones have affected the archipelago, most recently Cyclone Chido in December 2024, which killed at least 20 people when it hit Mayotte.

The island group has a history of deadly and disruptive cyclones. In February and April 1898, cyclones moved through the islands, causing a famine. After cyclones struck in December 1904 and 1905, another famine occurred in the islands, killing 490 people. A cyclone in December 1950 killed 585 people. In January 1983, Severe Tropical Storm Elinah killed 33 people from high winds and floods. In 2019, Cyclone Kenneth killed nine people and injured 200 others.

== Climatology ==
Due to their low latitude, the islands are rarely affected by tropical cyclones.

== Events ==
- 25 October 1864 – A cyclone moved through the Comoros, damaging buildings.
- 27 February 1898 – A cyclone passed near Mayotte, causing heavy damage to buildings and crops while also leading to injuries and deaths. The cyclone led to the collapse of the island's sugar industry. There was a famine after the cyclone.
- 22–23 April 1898 – Another cyclone moved through Mayotte, affecting residents struggling to recover after the previous cyclone. After the back-to-back cyclones, the government of France provided ₣700,000 to the colony toward residents, public works, as well as a smallpox epidemic.
- 14 December 1904 – A cyclone moved through or near the islands of Mayotte, Anjouan, and Mohe, causing significant housing and crop damage, which left residents homeless.
- 16 December 1905 – A cyclone struck the islands of Anjouan and Moheli, killing 30 people and injuring another 150 people. The passage of two cyclones within a year, in conjunction with little rainfall, led to a famine that killed 490 people between August 1905 and January 1906.
- 3 February 1908 – A tropical storm affected the island of Anjouan.
- 14 April 1908 – A cyclone killed nine people as it passed near Anjouan, Moheli, and Grande Comore. The cyclone also damaged crops.
- 1924 – A cyclone destroyed a village in Pamandzi on the island of Mayotte.
- February 1934 – Cyclone Disséli produced wind gusts of over 150 km/h (93 mph) in Mayotte, destroying the villages of Dzaoudzi, Pamandzi, Bouéni, Mzouazia, and Mtsapere. The cyclone's crop damage was so significant that there was a famine on the island afterward.
- 22–23 December 1950 – A cyclone killed 585 people while moving through Anjouan and Moheli, injuring 70,000 others. The cyclone left 40,000 people homeless, and also caused ₣3.5 worth of damage to crops and infrastructure.
- January 1953 – A cyclone passed near Mayotte, producing winds of 100 km/h (62 mph). The storm caused heavy damage to Dzaoudzi.
- 16–18 January 1968 – Cyclone Georgette passed south of the Comoros. It killed one person and caused flooding on the islands.
- 19 November 1969 – Moderate Tropical Storm Corrine struck the island of Pamanzi in Mayotte, killing two people. Winds reached 96 km/h (60 mph), while heavy rainfall caused landslides.
- 17 January–6 February 1971 – Tropical Cyclone Felicie dropped heavy rainfall across Mayotte, reaching 939 mm (37.0 in) in Dzoumogné.
- January 1976 – Tropical Storm Clotilde passed near Mayotte, producing winds of 112 km/h (70 mph).
- December 1981 – Tropical Cyclone Benedicte passed near Mayotte, producing wind gusts of over 61 km/h (38 mph).
- 11 January 1983 – Severe Tropical Storm Elinah passed between the islands of Anjouan and Mohéli. Winds reached 136 km/h (85 mph), while high waves killed 33 people and left US$23.1 million in damage.
- 10 April 1984 – Cyclone Kamisy struck Mayotte, killing one person. Wind gusts reached 148 km/h (92 mph). The commune of Sada was 90% destroyed. Damage was estimated at ₣168 million.
- February 1985 – Tropical Storm Feliska passed near Mayotte, producing wind gusts of 126 km/h (78 mph), along with heavy rainfall. The damage was estimated at ₣60 million, two-thirds of which was related to road damage.
- 12 April 1990 – Tropical Storm Hanta passed just north of Mayotte, producing gusts of 65 km/h (40 mph), along with 75 mm (3.0 in) worth of precipitation.
- 4 March 2001 – Tropical Storm Dera moved through Mayotte during its formative stages, dropping 236.2 mm (9.30 in) worth of rainfall at Pamandzi. The rains damaged crops and caused power outages.
- 23 January–2 February 2004 – The precursor to Cyclone Elita produced 154.8 mm (6.09 in) worth of rainfall at Chiconi in Mayotte. Three people died after a landslide collapsed the wall of a house.
- 6–10 March 2005 – Cyclone Gafilo produced heavy rainfall in Mayotte, reaching 250 mm (9.8 in) at Dzoumogné. The rains caused river runoff.
- 20 January 2005 – Cyclone Ernest hit Mayotte, where wind gusts reached 98 km/h (61 mph).
- 30 November 2006 – Moderate Tropical Storm Anita passed west of the archipelago, producing heavy rainfall.
- 23–24 January 2008 – Developing Tropical Storm Fame dropped heavy rainfall in Mayotte, reaching 394 mm (15.5 in) in Convalescence. The rains caused landslides, and left 4,000 people without power.
- 29–30 March 2014 – Cyclone Hellen produced heavy rainfall and a storm surge throughout the archipelago, while the storm was moving southeastward through the Mozambique Channel. Hellen killed one person, and damaged or destroyed 901 houses.
- 24 April 2019 – Cyclone Kenneth passed just north of the Comoros Islands, killing seven people and injuring 200 others. The cyclone's damage was estimated at CF81.7 billion (US$186 million), equivalent to 16% of the country's GDP.
- 14 December 2024 – Cyclone Chido struck Mayotte, producing wind gusts of 226 km/h (140 mph). Chido killed at least 20 people on the island and injured 830 others. The cyclone was considered the strongest and most damaging to hit the island since 1934.

== Climatological statistics ==
Storms affecting the Comoros Islands by month
Month	Number of storms
January	8
February	4
March	3
April	5
October	1
November	2
December	5

Storms affecting the Comoros Islands by period
Period	Number of storms
1800s	3
1900–49	6
1950s	2
1960s	2
1970s	2
1980s	4
1990s	1
2000s	6
2010s	2
2020s	1

== See also ==
- Tropical cyclones in Southern Africa
- Tropical cyclones in the Mascarene Islands
