= Tropical cyclones in Southern Africa =

Storms affecting Tanzania, Mozambique, and South Africa

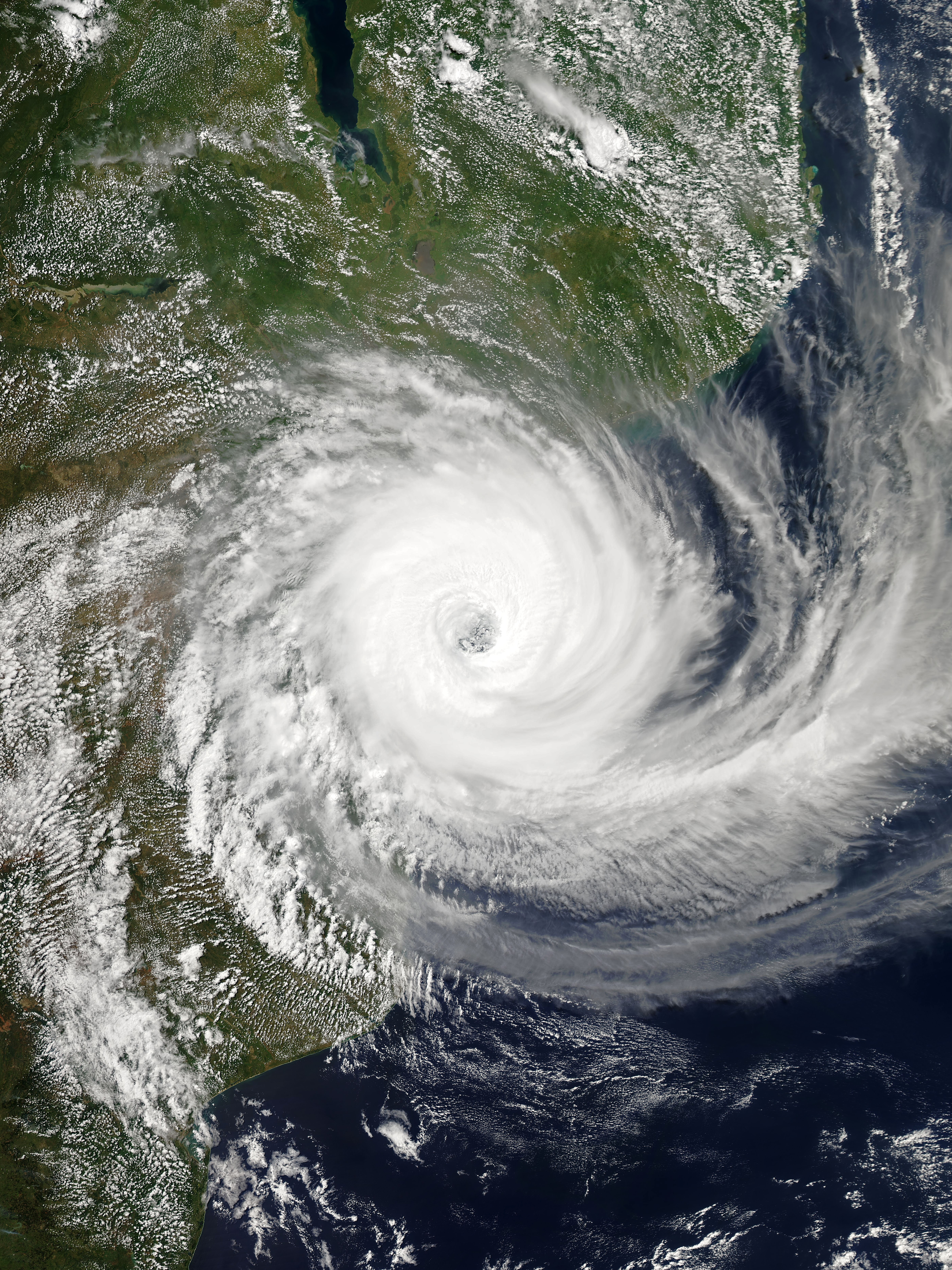
Satellite image of Cyclone Idai, one of the costliest and deadliest tropical cyclones on record in Africa

At least 54 tropical cyclones have affected the Southern African mainland. Three southeastern African countries border the Indian Ocean – Tanzania, Mozambique, and South Africa. Other inland countries also experience the effects of tropical cyclones, including Botswana, Eswatini, Lesotho, Malawi, Namibia, Zambia, and Zimbabwe.

== Storms ==
=== 1800s ===
- April 1872 – A cyclone affected Zanzibar and Bagamoyo in current-day Tanzania.

=== 1900s ===
- 15 February 1950 – After crossing Madagascar, a cyclone struck eastern Mozambique and moved across much of Africa, eventually reaching northern Namibia.
- 15 April 1952 – A cyclone moved ashore southeastern Tanzania near Lindi with maximum sustained winds estimated at 180 km/h (110 mph); this made the cyclone the strongest on record to strike the country. The cyclone left 34 fatalities in Tanzania.
- 28 January 1984 – Tropical Storm Domoina struck southeastern Mozambique, and later crossed into Swaziland and eastern South Africa. In Mozambique, Domoina killed 109 people and caused about $75 million in damage. Rainfall in Swaziland reached 906 mm (35.7 in) at Piggs Peak. Damage in the country totaled $54 million, with 73 deaths. In South Africa, rainfall peaked at 950 mm (37 in, causing 100 year floods along the Umfolozi River. The Pongola River altered its course after the storm. Flooding caused the Pongolapoort Dam to reach 87% of its capacity; when waters were released to maintain the structural integrity, additional flooding occurred in Mozambique, forcing thousands to evacuate. Across South Africa, the storm caused 60 deaths and damaged the properties of 500,000 people, causing R100 million (1984 ZAR, $70 million 1984 USD). (Note: Original source is in South African rand, converted to United States dollar.)
- 19 February 1984 – Tropical Storm Imboa looped off the east coast of South Africa, causing flooding and killing four people in the country.

=== 2000s ===
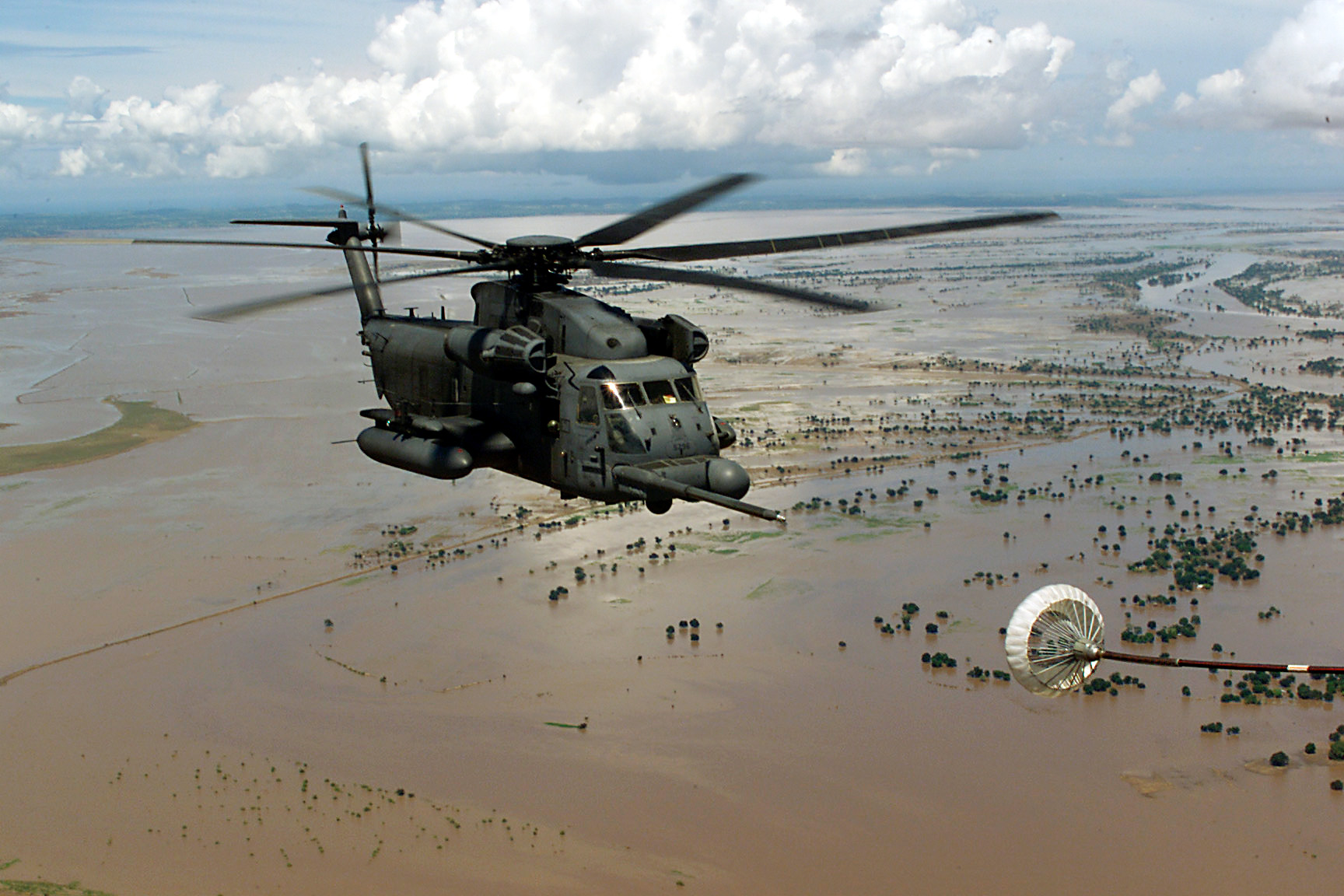
Image of United States helicopter flying over flooded Mozambique after Cyclone Eline

- 3 January 2000 – A tropical depression, previously Tropical Storm Astride, struck northeastern Mozambique and produced rainfall as far inland as Malawi.
- 22 February 2000 – Cyclone Eline moved ashore near Beira, Mozambique. Exasperating previous floods, the cyclone produced the country's worst natural disaster in a century. Water levels along the Limpopo River reached as high as 11 m (36 ft) above normal and 15 km (9.3 mi) wide. The combined effects of the preceding floods and Eline left about 300,000 people homeless, about 700 deaths, and damage estimated at $500 million (2000 USD). The cyclone and the floods disrupted much of the economic progress Mozambique had made in the 1990s since the end of its civil war. Eline also killed 21 people in South Africa, where damage reached at least US$300 million. In Zimbabwe, Eline washed away transportation infrastructure and killed 12 people. Heavy rainfall occurred as far inland as Namibia.
- 8 March 2000 – Rains from former Tropical Storm Gloria disrupted aid distribution in Mozambique following Eline's deadly landfall two weeks prior.
- 2 April 2000 – Cyclone Hudah made landfall in northeastern Mozambique near Antalaha, marking the first time on record that two storms of tropical cyclone intensity struck the country. Hudah killed three people and damaged hundreds of homes.
- 11 April 2000 – A subtropical depression approached the Mozambique coast near Inhambane, dropping 93.8 mm (3.69 in) of rainfall over 48 hours.
- 8 March 2001 – A tropical depression brushed the east coast of Mozambique and later intensified into Tropical Cyclone Dera in the Mozambique Channel. Flooding from the storm destroyed a few homes and killed two people.
- 30 December 2001 – The precursor to Tropical Storm Cyprien developed over eastern Mozambique, bringing rainfall, and later becoming a tropical storm in the Mozambique Channel.
- 12 November 2002 – Tropical Depression Atang moved ashore near the border of Mozambique and Tanzania, bringing rainfall.
- 31 December 2002 – Tropical Storm Delfina struck eastern Mozambique, and over the next few days drifted over land until re-emerging into the Mozambique Channel on 6 January 2003. The storm dropped heavy rainfall, reaching 281 mm (11.1 in) in Nampula. The rains caused flooding that damaged or destroyed more than 20,000 houses. Delfina killed 47 people in Mozambique and eight in neighboring Malawi.
- 2 March 2003 – Cyclone Japhet struck Mozambique near Vilankulo, where wind gusts reached 105 km/h (65 mph). Across the country, Japhet damaged or destroyed 25,000 houses, killing 17 people. There was another eight deaths in neighboring Zambia.
- 29 January 2004 – Cyclone Elita destroyed over 2,000 buildings in Mozambique's Nampula Province.
- 29 October 2004 – A tropical depression made landfall in Tanzania.
- 30 November 2006 – Tropical Storm Anita dropped heavy rainfall in southeast Tanzania while moving close to Mozambique, reaching 152 mm (6.0 in) over 24 hours. Heavy rainfall also occurred in northern Mozambique.
- 22 February 2007 – Cyclone Favio struck southern Mozambique and killed 10 people and caused $71 million in damage.
- 29 December 2007 – Tropical Storm Elnus alongside Cyclone Fame contributed to flooding in low-lying areas of Malawi.
- 23 January 2008 – Cyclone Fame alongside Tropical Storm Elnus contributed to flooding in low-lying areas of Malawi.
- 8 March 2008 – Cyclone Jokwe killed 13 people in Mozambique's Nampula Province and affected 200,000 people.
- 24 October 2008 – The remnants of Tropical Storm Asma brought rain to areas of Mozambique and Tanzania.

=== 2010s ===
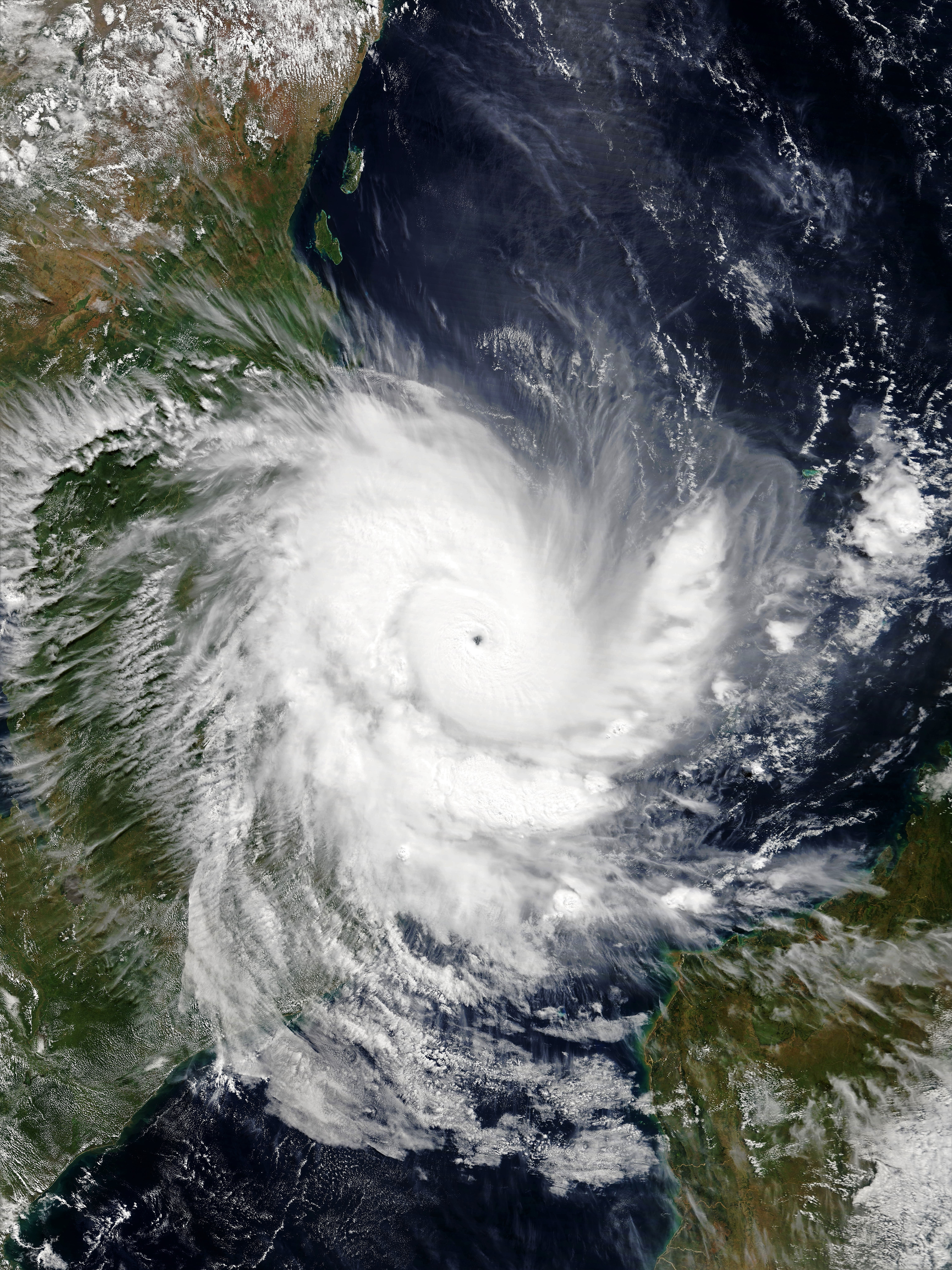
Satellite image of Cyclone Kenneth near landfall

- 17 January 2012 – Subtropical Depression Dando struck southern Mozambique, bringing heavy rainfall across the region. The storm killed four people in Mozambique and another six in South Africa. Damage in South Africa was around $65 million.
- 21 January 2012 – Cyclone Funso looped off the east coast of Mozambique. Heavy rains related to the storm killed 21 people in the country. Rains also extended into Malawi.
- 6 March 2012 – Tropical Storm Irina looped off southeastern Africa, causing 12 deaths between Mozambique and South Africa.
- 16 February 2013 – The precursor to Cyclone Haruna moved across northeastern Mozambique.
- 20 January 2014 – Former Tropical Storm Deliwe struck eastern Mozambique.
- 31 January 2014 – A tropical disturbance moved ashore eastern Mozambique.
- 17 February 2014 – The precursor to Tropical Storm Guito developed over northeastern Mozambique.
- 26 March 2014 – Heavy rainfall from developing Cyclone Hellen over northeastern Mozambique killed four people. The remnants of the storm later struck south-central Mozambique.
- 14 January 2015 – The precursor to Tropical Storm Chedza produced flooding rains across southeastern Africa.
- 27 April 2016 – The remnants of Cyclone Fantala produced flooding in Tanzania that killed 13 people and washed away 315 houses. Rainfall from the storm spread northward into Kenya, causing flooding.
- 15 February 2017 – Cyclone Dineo struck central Mozambique, causing flooding that extended into Zimbabwe and Malawi. It killed 7 people in Mozambique and 251 people in Zimbabwe.
- 15 January 2018 – Tropical Depression 4 struck northeastern Mozambique and meandered over the country. Heavy rainfall killed 11 people.
- 17 January 2019 – A tropical low formed over Mozambique and later intensified into Tropical Storm Desmond in the Mozambique Channel, which struck southern Mozambique a few days later. It dropped heavy rainfall along its path.
- 4 March 2019 – A tropical depression moved ashore Mozambique, and later moved into the Mozambique Channel, strengthening into Cyclone Idai. The intense tropical cyclone made landfall near Beira and weakened as it moved into Zimbabwe. The cyclone killed 1,302 people across Mozambique, Zimbabwe, and Malawi, making it the second-deadliest tropical cyclone on record in the Southern Hemisphere, only behind the 1973 Flores cyclone in Indonesia. Idai caused widespread and disruptive flooding, with monetary damage estimated at US$2.2 billion. The storm also led to a cholera outbreak across the region.
- 25 April 2019 – Cyclone Kenneth became the strongest tropical cyclone on record to strike Mozambique, when it moved ashore just north of Pemba. The JTWC estimated landfall winds of 220 km/h (140 mph). Kenneth killed 45 people in Mozambique, less than two months after Idai's deadly trek through the region.

=== 2020s ===
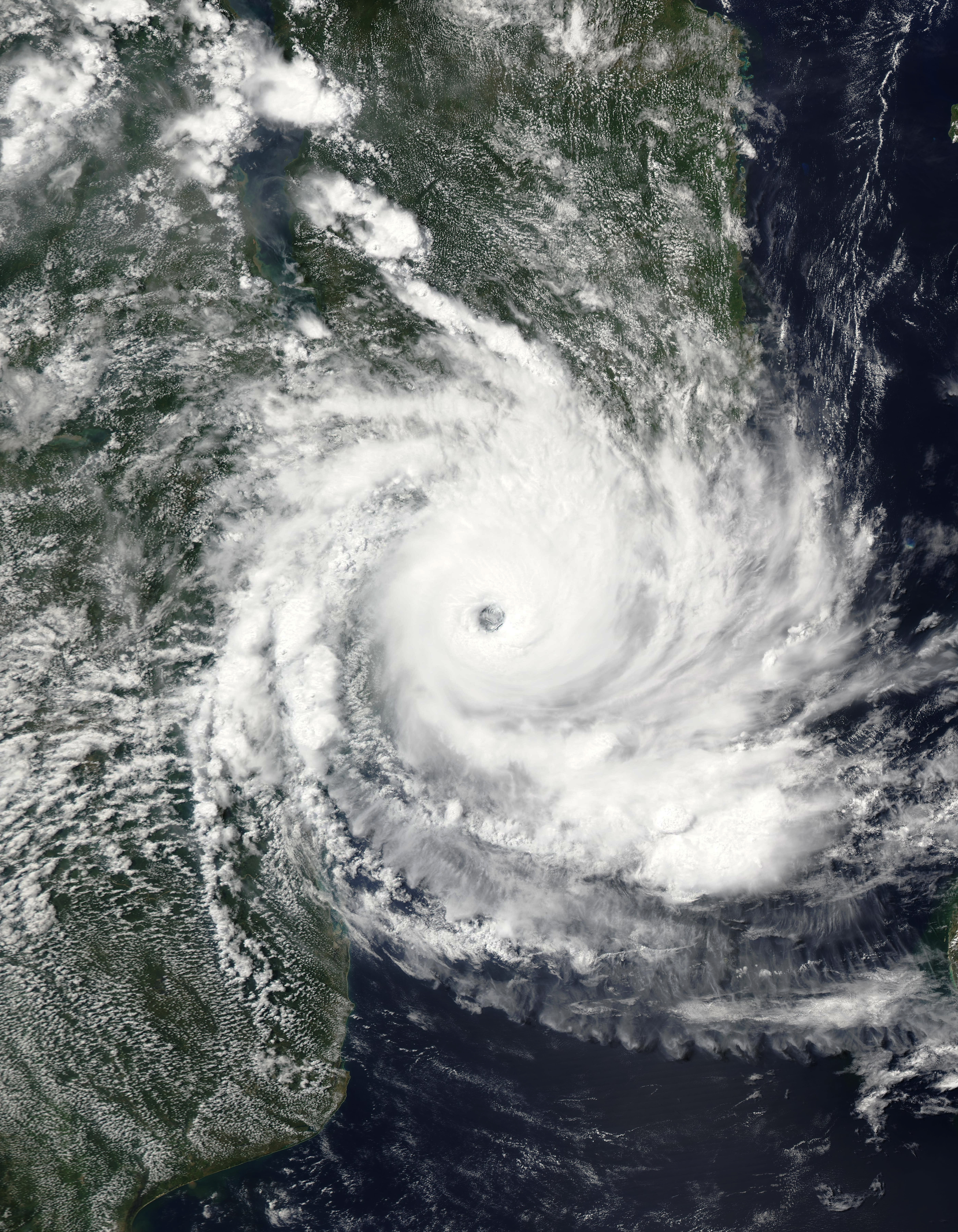
Satellite image of Cyclone Freddy striking Mozambique in March 2023

- 30 December 2020 – Tropical Storm Chalane struck Mozambique and moved across southern Africa, emerging into the South Atlantic Ocean on January 3. Heavy rainfall occurred as far west as Namibia.
- 22 January 2021 – Cyclone Eloise made landfall just north of Beira, Mozambique, and continued southwestward, eventually dissipating over South Africa. The storm killed 11 in Mozambique, 10 in South Africa, 3 in Zimbabwe, and 2 in Eswatini.
- 12 February 2021 – The precursor to Cyclone Guambe moved ashore southern Mozambique, and later moved back through the country and redeveloped in the Mozambique Channel. The storm brought heavy rainfall to the region.
- 24 April 2021 – Cyclone Jobo dissipated just off the east coast of Tanzania. Its remnants brought rainfall and strong winds that killed 22 people in the country.
- 24 January 2022 – Tropical Storm Ana struck northern Mozambique, killing 20 people in the country and 37 in Malawi.
- 18 February 2022 – Tropical Storm Dumako dissipated near the east coast of Mozambique, bringing heavy rainfall.
- 11 March 2022 – Cyclone Gombe struck Nampula Province in Mozambique as an intense tropical cyclone. It killed 63 people in the country, and another 7 in neighboring Malawi.
- 12 April 2022 – Subtropical Depression Issa formed near the southeast coast of South Africa.
- 24 February 2023 – Cyclone Freddy made landfall in Mozambique causing heavy rains in a number of countries in the region, the hardest hit was Malawi where the rains caused catastrophic flooding. It killed 198 people in the country, and another 1,218 in neighboring Malawi and Zimbabwe.
- 12 March 2024 – Tropical Storm Filipo struck Inhambane Province in Mozambique as a severe tropical storm. It killed 2 people in the country.
- 4 May 2024 – Cyclone Hidaya – One of the few tropical cyclones in recent times to impact Tanzania. Though not without precedent.
- 21 May 2024 – Cyclone Ialy killed 2 people in Kenya.
- 15 December 2024 – Cyclone Chido became the costliest South-West Indian Ocean cyclone on record as it made landfall in Mozambique, leaving 155,000 houses badly affected and 120 people dead.
- 13 January 2025 – Cyclone Dikeledi made landfall in Mozambique, killing 6 and affecting 70,423 people.
- 10 March 2025 – Cyclone Jude made landfall in Mozambique, killing 16 and leaving 3 missing in Mozambique and Malawi.
- 14 February 2026 – Cyclone Gezani approached Mozambique, where in Inhambane water services were cut off and 13,000 citizens were left without power. As a result, four people were killed.

== Climatological statistics ==
Storms affecting Southern Africa by month
Month	Number of storms
January	14
February	11
March	10
April	8
May	2
October	2
November	2
December	5

Storms affecting Southern Africa by period
Period	Number of storms
1800s	1
1950s	2
1980s	2
2000s	18
2010s	15
2020s	16

== See also ==
- Tropical cyclones in the Comoros Islands
- Tropical cyclones in the Mascarene Islands
