= Meido =

Meido may refer to:

- French maid or meido in Japanese, a popular costume in cosplay
- Meido (冥土, lit. "Dark Land"; "Underworld"), Another name for Yomi, sometimes considered similar to Ne-no-kuni and the Sanzu-no-kawa; the Japanese reading of míngtú, a Buddhist concept of the course of the dead as they enter Diyu
- Meido Zangetsuha, a technique of the InuYasha character Sesshomaru's Tenseiga and also of the title character, InuYasha's Tetsusaiga

== See also ==
- Maïdo, a volcanic peak on the island of Réunion
