= Cyclone Kenneth =

South-West Indian cyclone in 2019

Intense Tropical Cyclone Kenneth
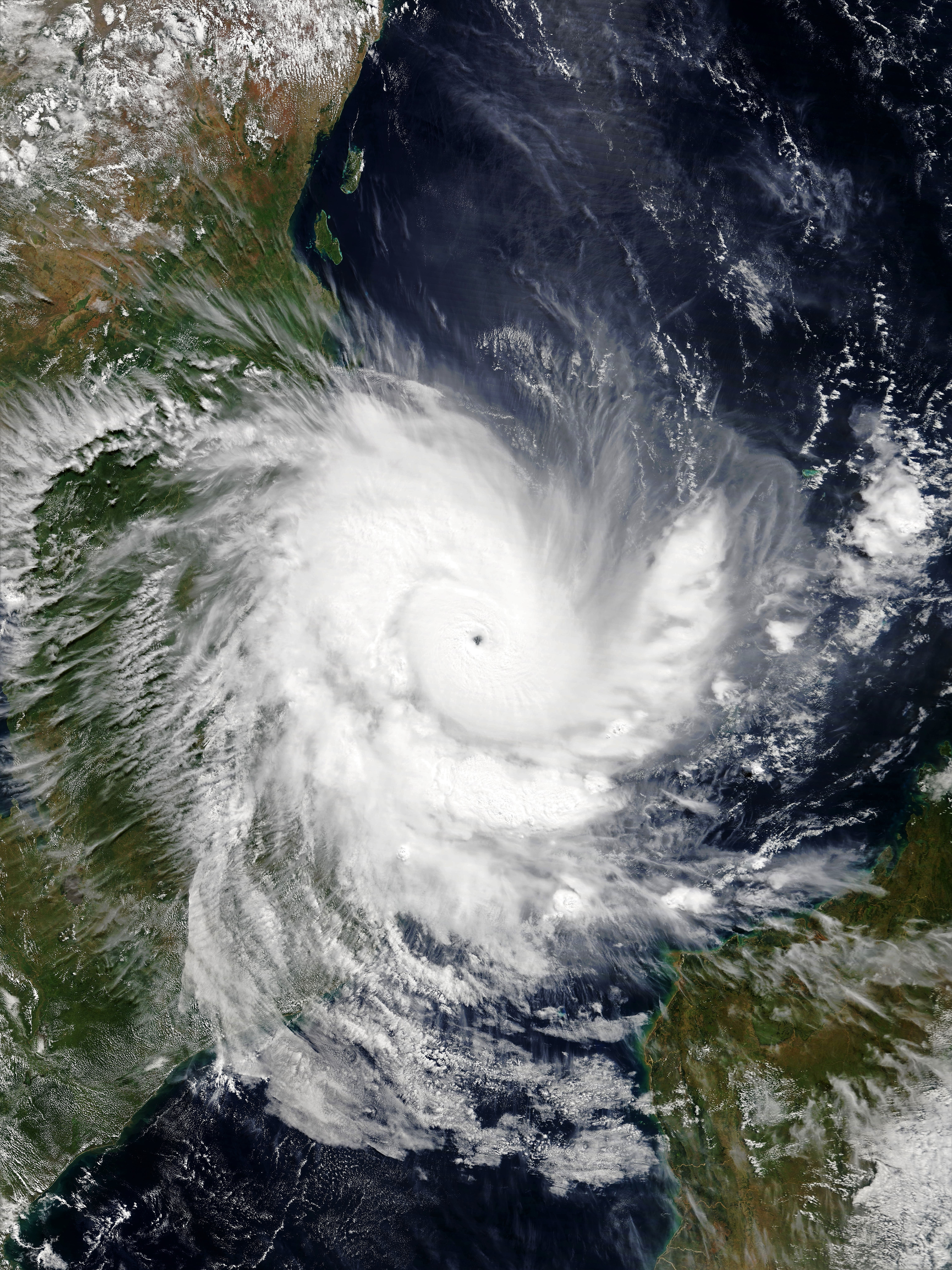
- Cyclone Kenneth at peak intensity approaching Mozambique on 25 April

Meteorological history
- Formed: 21 April 2019
- Dissipated: 29 April 2019

Intense tropical cyclone
- 10-minute sustained (MFR)
- Highest winds: 215 km/h (130 mph)
- Highest gusts: 295 km/h (185 mph)
- Lowest pressure: 930 hPa (mbar); 27.46 inHg

Category 4-equivalent tropical cyclone
- 1-minute sustained (SSHWS/JTWC)
- Highest winds: 230 km/h (145 mph)
- Lowest pressure: 934 hPa (mbar); 27.58 inHg

Overall effects
- Fatalities: 52 total
- Damage: $345 million (2019 USD)
- Areas affected: Seychelles, Comoros, Mayotte, Madagascar, Mozambique, Tanzania, Malawi
- IBTrACS /
- Part of the 2018–19 South-West Indian Ocean cyclone season

Intense Tropical Cyclone Kenneth was the strongest tropical cyclone to make landfall in Mozambique since modern records began. The cyclone also caused significant damage in the Comoro Islands and Tanzania. The fourteenth tropical storm, record-breaking tenth tropical cyclone, and ninth intense tropical cyclone of the 2018–19 South-West Indian Ocean cyclone season, Kenneth formed from a vortex that the Météo-France office on La Réunion (MFR) first mentioned on 17 April. The MFR monitored the system over the next several days, before designating it as Tropical Disturbance 14 on 21 April. The disturbance was located in a favorable environment to the north of Madagascar, which allowed it to strengthen into a tropical depression and later a tropical storm, both on the next day. The storm then began a period of rapid intensification, ultimately peaking as an intense tropical cyclone with 10-minute sustained winds of 215 km/h (134 mph) and a minimum central pressure of 934 hPa (27.58 inHg). At that time, Kenneth began to undergo an eyewall replacement cycle and weakened slightly, before making landfall later that day as an intense tropical cyclone. As a result of land interaction, Kenneth became disorganised as it made landfall and rapidly degenerated thereafter. The storm then shifted southward, with the MFR cancelling all major warnings for inland cities. Kenneth was reclassified as an overland depression after landfall, with the MFR issuing its warning at midnight UTC on 26 April. Thunderstorm activity developed off the coast of Mozambique on 27 April as the system began drifting northward. Kenneth re-emerged off the coast of northern Mozambique on 28 April, before dissipating on the next day.

In the country of Comoros; Kenneth's wind and rainfall caused at least seven deaths. Damage was estimated at US$345 million. Prior to Kenneth's landfall, local authorities evacuated over 30,000 people in the path of the storm in northern Mozambique. Kenneth killed 45 people in Mozambique.

== Meteorological history ==
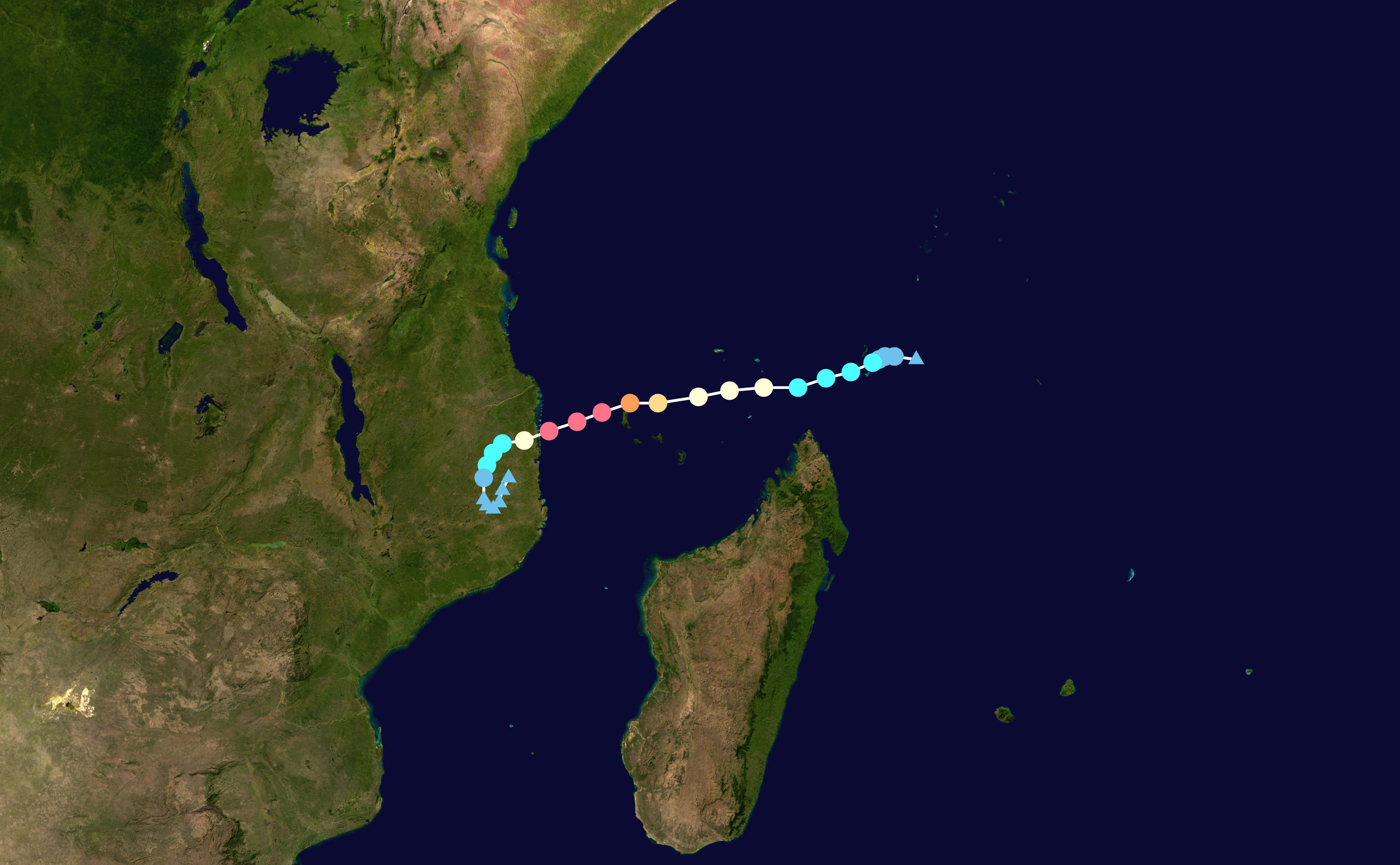
Map plotting the storm's track and intensity, according to the Saffir–Simpson scale Map key Saffir–Simpson scale Tropical depression (≤38 mph, ≤62 km/h) Tropical storm (39–73 mph, 63–118 km/h) Category 1 (74–95 mph, 119–153 km/h) Category 2 (96–110 mph, 154–177 km/h) Category 3 (111–129 mph, 178–208 km/h) Category 4 (130–156 mph, 209–251 km/h) Category 5 (≥157 mph, ≥252 km/h) Unknown Storm type Tropical cyclone Subtropical cyclone Extratropical cyclone, remnant low, tropical disturbance, or monsoon depression

On 17 April, the MFR began monitoring a vortex to the north of Madagascar. The MFR continued to monitor the system over the next several days, noting a significant increase in deep convection on 21 April. On 22 April at 12:00 UTC, the MFR began issuing advisories on the system, designating it as Tropical Disturbance 14. Soon after, the Joint Typhoon Warning Center (JTWC) issued a tropical cyclone formation alert, noting that the disturbance was located in a favorable environment with low vertical wind shear and warm sea surface temperatures of 29–30 °C (84–86 °F). Early on 23 April, the JTWC began issuing warnings on the system, classifying it as Tropical Cyclone 24S. A few hours later, the MFR upgraded the system to a tropical depression while it was moving west, under the influence of a low-to-mid-level ridge located to the south. The MFR upgraded the depression to a moderate tropical storm at 12:00 UTC, assigning the name Kenneth to the storm. At that time, the MFR stated that cloud top temperatures had decreased to −90 °C (−130 °F) and that the overall organization of the system had improved.

Soon after being named, Kenneth began to rapidly intensify, with the JTWC noting that a formative eye feature had developed. Around 00:00 UTC on 24 April, the MFR upgraded the system to a severe tropical storm. A few hours later, the JTWC followed suit, upgrading Kenneth to the equivalent of a Category 1 hurricane on the Saffir–Simpson hurricane wind scale. At 12:00 UTC, Kenneth was upgraded by the MFR into the record-breaking tenth tropical cyclone of the season. At that time, the MFR stated that an eye was attempting to form within the central dense overcast of the storm, and that wind shear was beginning to decrease. Around 18:00 UTC, Kenneth strengthened into the equivalent of a Category 3 major hurricane. At that time, the Hahaya International Airport on the Comoros island of Grand Comore reported winds of 36 knots (67 km/h; 41 mph) while Kenneth was located about 55 km (34 mi) to the north. Six hours later, the MFR upgraded Kenneth to intense tropical cyclone status, noting that the storm had a very cold convective ring and that the core had become more compact. On 25 April, at 06:00 UTC, Kenneth reached peak intensity, with 10-minute sustained winds of 215 km/h (134 mph) and a minimum central pressure of 934 hPa (27.58 inHg). At that time, Kenneth had a pinhole eye surrounded by very strong convection; however, the storm also began to undergo an eyewall replacement cycle. Meanwhile, the JTWC estimated that Kenneth peaked as a Category 4-equivalent tropical cyclone, with 1-minute sustained winds of 230 km/h (140 mph). As Kenneth approached the Mozambique coastline, the system slowly began to weaken due to the eyewall replacement cycle and the frictional effects of land interaction. Later that day, at 13:15 UTC, Kenneth made landfall in Mozambique as an intense tropical cyclone, just north of Pemba, with 1-minute sustained winds of 220 km/h (140 mph), equivalent to a Category 4 hurricane. This made Kenneth the most intense landfalling tropical cyclone in the recorded history of Mozambique. This also marked the second time in Mozambique's recorded history in which two storms have made landfall during the same cyclone season at intense tropical cyclone intensity or higher.

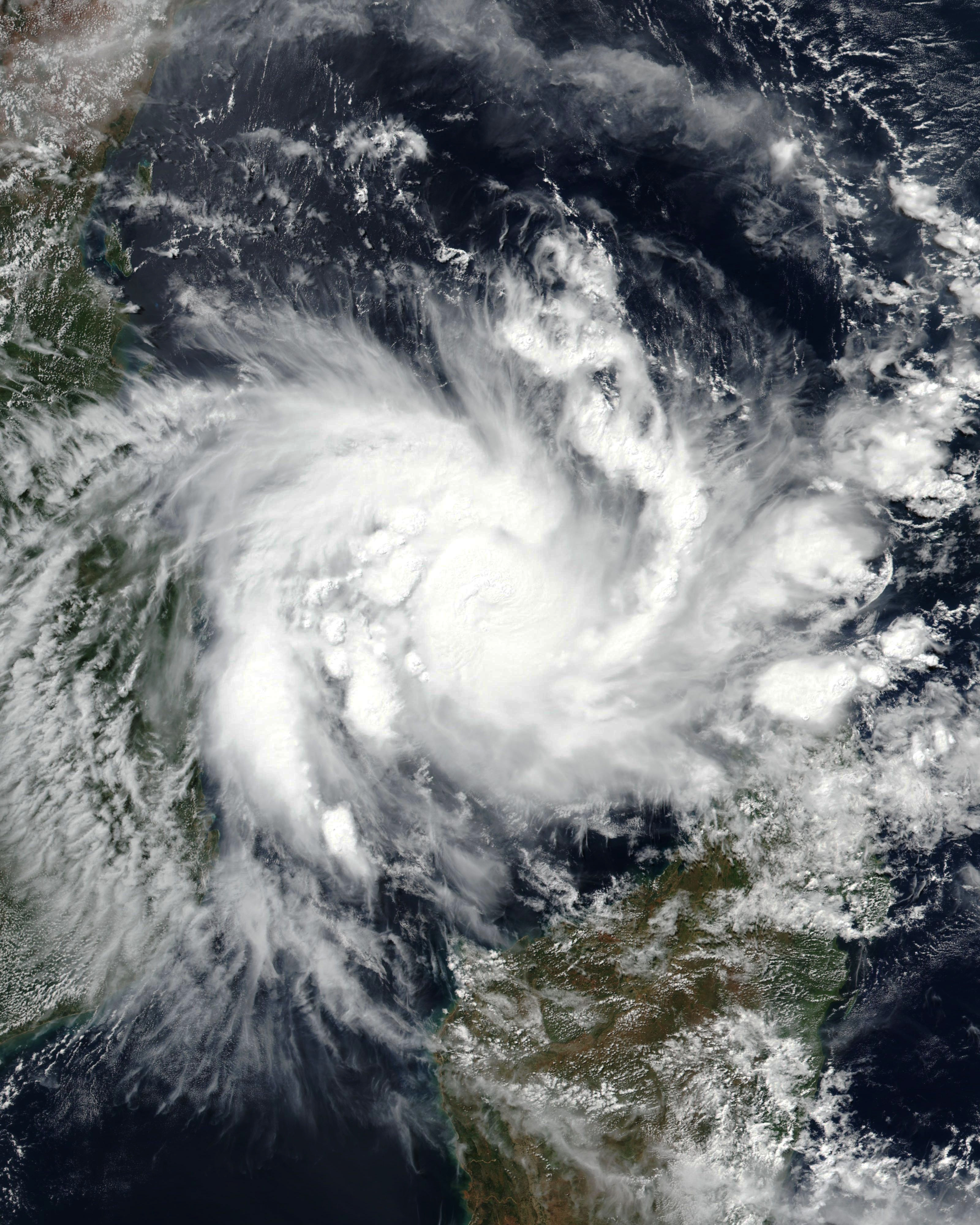
Satellite image of Cyclone Kenneth approaching the Comoro Islands on 24 April

After landfall, Kenneth was re-classified as an overland depression, with 10-minute sustained winds of 155 km/h (96 mph), just below intense tropical cyclone strength. As the storm drifted further inland, it rapidly degenerated. Shortly afterward, the JTWC issued its last warning on the system. Kenneth's central convection had drastically shrunk, with only a small area remaining over land. Despite still being in a favorable atmospheric environment, Kenneth continued to rapidly weaken due to interaction with land. At 00:00 UTC on 26 April, the MFR issued its last warning on Kenneth, reporting 10-minute sustained winds of 65 km/h (40 mph), while the system was located about 110 km (68 mi) inland in Mozambique. Kenneth continued to weaken, with its winds falling below gale force as it continued its southward motion. On 27 April, thunderstorms developed off the coast of Mozambique, although the center of Kenneth remained over land, as the system began drifting northward. On 28 April, Kenneth emerged off the coast of northern Mozambique, but continued to weaken due to unfavorable conditions. Subsequently, Kenneth dissipated by 12:00 UTC on 29 April.

== Preparations and impact ==
Costliest South-West Indian Ocean tropical cyclones
Rank	Tropical cyclones	Season	Damage
1	4 Chido	2024–25	$3.9 billion
2	4 Idai	2018–19	$3.3 billion
3	3 Gezani	2025–26	$2 billion
4	5 Freddy	2022–23	$1.53 billion
5	3 Garance	2024–25	$1.05 billion
6	3 Fytia	2025–26	$475 million
7	4 Enawo	2016–17	$400 million
8	4 Kenneth	2018–19	$345 million
9	4 Leon–Eline	1999–00	$309 million
10	4 Dina	2001–02	$287 million

Overall, Kenneth killed at least 52 people and damage is estimated to be at least US$345 million.

In the country of Comoros, Kenneth's winds and rains killed at least seven people and injured more than 200 others. Preliminary estimates state that approximately 60–80% of staple crops were destroyed. Damage was estimated at CF81.7 billion (US$186 million), equivalent to 16% of the country's GDP.

Kenneth struck Mozambique about a month after Cyclone Idai had devastated the northern part of the country, raising fears that the ongoing humanitarian crisis there could be worsened by the storm. Local authorities in northern Mozambique evacuated more than 30,000 people ahead of the storm, given the expected impacts.

Cyclone Kenneth made landfall just north of Pemba, Mozambique on Thursday evening, 25 April, at about 4:15 p.m., local time (12:15 UTC), with 1-minute sustained winds of 220 km/h (140 mph). The IFRC reported widespread damage in the city, with power outages recorded throughout the city and numerous trees felled, which caused even more damage. In Mozambique, a total of 45 people were killed, including a woman who was killed by a falling coconut tree near Pemba. Additionally, four ships sank off the coast of the town of Palma. On Ibo Island, it was reported that 90% of the homes were destroyed. In Cabo Delgado Province, 2,500 homes were destroyed with multiple schools and hospitals also sustaining damage.

== Aftermath ==
After the storm, the European Union released €1.5 million (US$1.7 million) as an immediate assistance for those being affected by the cyclone in Mozambique and Comoros. The United Nations provided an emergency aid of $13 million to Mozambique and Comoros, which can help provide food and water, as well as repair the damaged infrastructure. The storm also resulted in a temporary reduction of violence amid the Islamist insurgency in Mozambique, though rebel attacks resumed in May 2019.

== See also ==
- Weather of 2019
- Tropical cyclones in 2019
- Cyclone Fantala
- Cyclone Eloise –hit Beira, Mozambique in January 2021
- Cyclone Idai – an intense tropical cyclone that impacted Mozambique earlier in March 2019, causing catastrophic flooding, widespread damage, and extensive loss of life
- Cyclone Freddy – An extremely deadly storm that made two landfalls in Mozamibique, the second one being close to where Kenneth struck
