= Cyclone Enawo =

South-West Indian ocean cyclone in 2017

Intense Tropical Cyclone Enawo
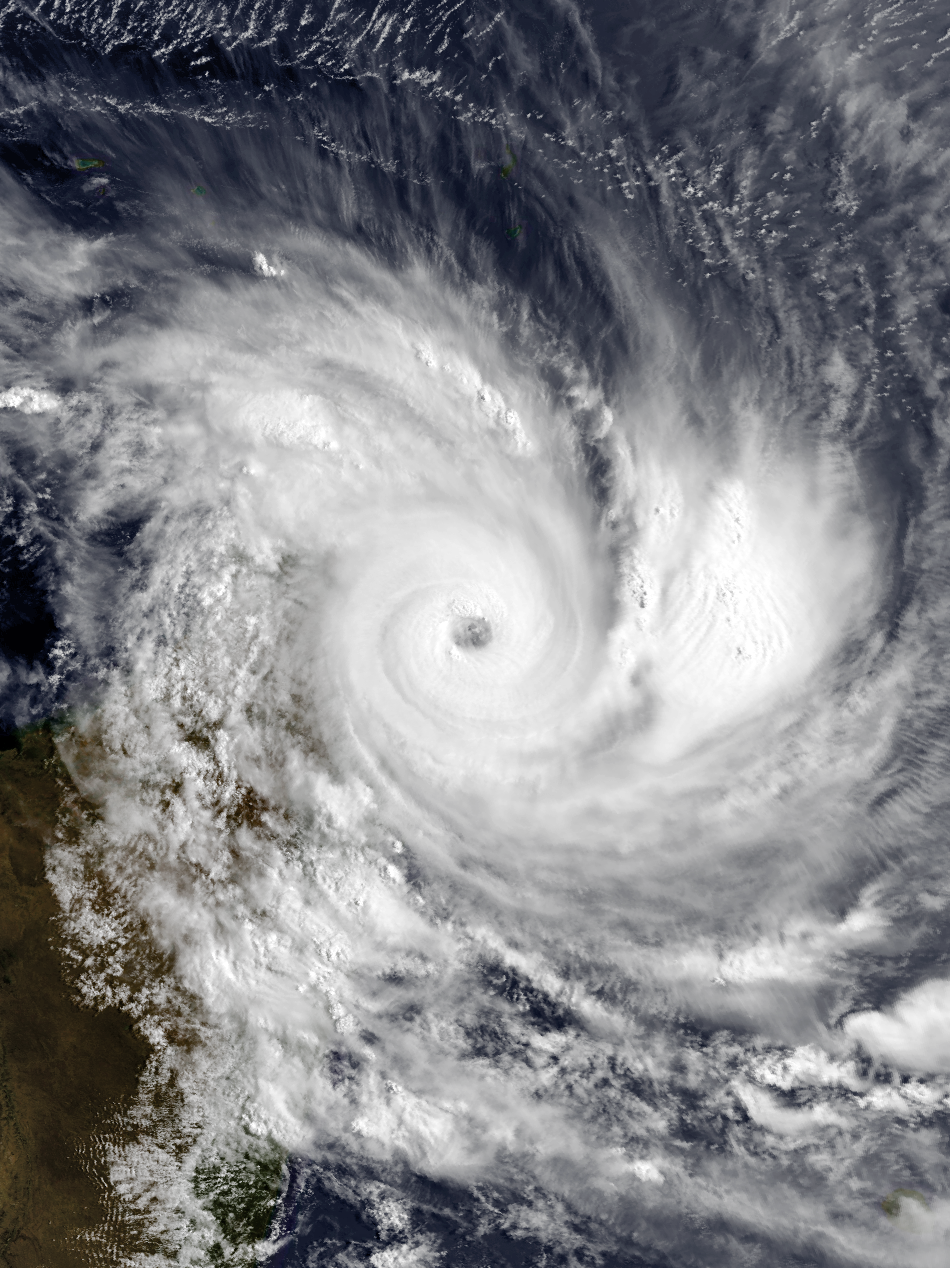
- Enawo at peak intensity just before landfall in Madagascar on 7 March

Meteorological history
- Formed: 2 March 2017
- Post-tropical: 10 March 2017
- Dissipated: 11 March 2017

Intense tropical cyclone
- 10-minute sustained (MFR)
- Highest winds: 205 km/h (125 mph)
- Highest gusts: 285 km/h (180 mph)
- Lowest pressure: 932 hPa (mbar); 27.52 inHg

Category 4-equivalent tropical cyclone
- 1-minute sustained (SSHWS/JTWC)
- Highest winds: 240 km/h (150 mph)
- Lowest pressure: 926 hPa (mbar); 27.34 inHg

Overall effects
- Fatalities: 78
- Missing: 18
- Damage: $400 million (2017 USD)
- Areas affected: Madagascar, Réunion
- IBTrACS /
- Part of the 2016–17 South-West Indian Ocean cyclone season

Intense Tropical Cyclone Enawo was the strongest tropical cyclone of the 2016–17 South-West Indian Ocean cyclone season. Enawo was the strongest tropical cyclone to strike Madagascar since Gafilo in 2004, killing 78 people and causing $400 million in damages. Forming as a moderate tropical storm on 3 March, Enawo initially drifted and intensified slowly. It strengthened into a tropical cyclone on 5 March and further an intense tropical cyclone on 6 March. Enawo made landfall over Sava Region on 7 March just after reaching peak intensity, and it emerged back into the Indian Ocean as a post-tropical depression late on 9 March, before dissipating two days later. The most severe impacts were seen in the districts of Antalaha and Maroantsetra.

== Meteorological history ==
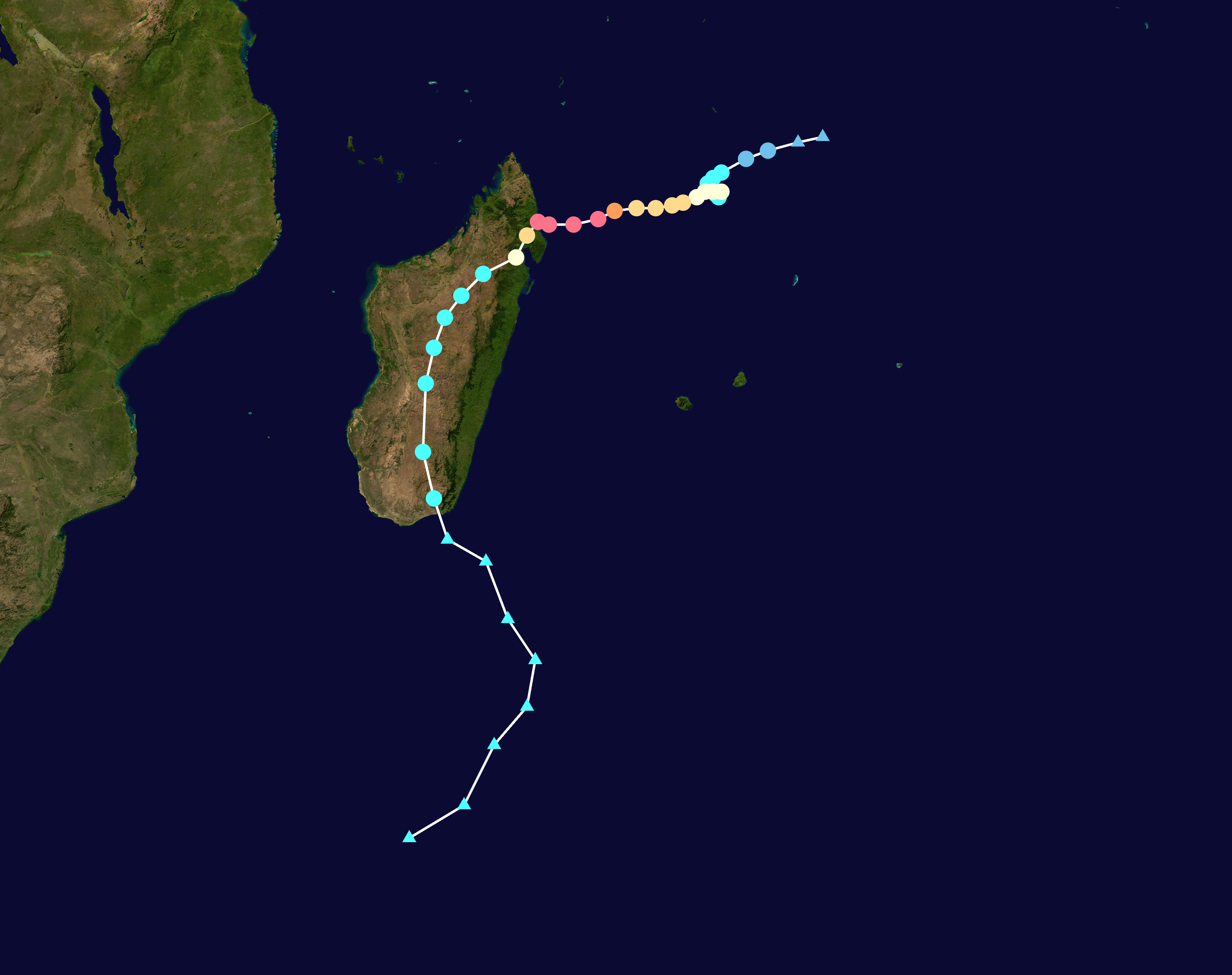
Map plotting the storm's track and intensity, according to the Saffir–Simpson scale Map key Saffir–Simpson scale Tropical depression (≤38 mph, ≤62 km/h) Tropical storm (39–73 mph, 63–118 km/h) Category 1 (74–95 mph, 119–153 km/h) Category 2 (96–110 mph, 154–177 km/h) Category 3 (111–129 mph, 178–208 km/h) Category 4 (130–156 mph, 209–251 km/h) Category 5 (≥157 mph, ≥252 km/h) Unknown Storm type Tropical cyclone Subtropical cyclone Extratropical cyclone, remnant low, tropical disturbance, or monsoon depression

A monsoon trough started to persist west of Diego Garcia in late February 2017 as the Madden–Julian oscillation (MJO) over the Indian Ocean grew more noticeable. On 2 March, a zone of disturbed weather formed within the area, although it was initially difficult to define a clear centre; later, the Joint Typhoon Warning Center (JTWC) issued a Tropical Cyclone Formation Alert for the improving low-level structure and favourable environmental conditions. Only six hours after the system about 820 km (510 mi) north of Mauritius intensifying to a tropical disturbance, Météo-France upgraded it to a moderate tropical storm at 06:00 UTC on 3 March with the name Enawo from the Mauritius Meteorological Services, because of the recent ASCAT-B data suggesting gale-force winds. The JTWC also began to issue tropical cyclone warnings on Enawo. Since the afternoon, Enawo started to significantly slow down with the weakening of the tropical ridge that drove the track southwards. Due to easterly vertical wind shear, the centre was located in the eastern part of deep convection.

Enawo developed into a severe tropical storm at around 18:00 UTC on 4 March, displaying an impressive embedded centre pattern associated with extremely cold cloud tops. The JTWC indicated a system equivalent to Category 1 on the Saffir–Simpson scale at the same time. Météo-France upgraded Enawo to a tropical cyclone at 06:00 UTC on 5 March, after it resumed a west to west-southwest track steered by the mid-troposphere ridge south of Madagascar. Enawo formed a ragged eye soon afterward, thanks to favourable conditions of excellent outflow, weaker vertical wind shear, and warm sea surface temperatures; however, the strengthening phase was halted for a half of day owing to a possible eyewall replacement cycle. Enawo started to intensify again and developed a well-defined eye indicated by both of satellite and microwave imageries, prompting Météo-France upgrading the system to an intense tropical cyclone at 12:00 UTC based on the structural improvements. The JTWC reported that Enawo had become a Category 4-equivalent cyclone at 18:00 UTC, with one-minute maximum sustained winds at 240 km/h (150 mph).

Early on 7 March, cloud tops cooled again around the eye, despite the fluctuating eye definition. Enawo reached its peak intensity at 06:00 UTC on 7 March, with ten-minute maximum sustained winds at 205 km/h (125 mph) and the central pressure at 932 hPa (27.32 inHg). Soon after that, Enawo made landfall over the area between Antalaha and Sambava in Sava Region, Madagascar at around 09:30 UTC (12:30 EAT), becoming the strongest landfall to the country since Gafilo in 2004. The cyclone started to rapidly weaken due to land interaction with a cloud-filled eye and the warming cloud tops; the JTWC also issued a final warning later for the inland movement. After classified as an overland depression early on 8 March and moving further inland, it started to accelerated southwards the next day along the weakening mid-troposphere ridge on Madagascar, with deep convection rather far away from the ill-defined centre. Meanwhile, gale-force winds still maintained over the eastern coast throughout the inland period. Enawo emerged into the Indian Ocean late on 9 March and was considered as a post-tropical depression by Météo-France because of the asymmetric and shallow core. However, the JTWC started to issue a tropical cyclone warning on Enawo again due to a 2 °C (36 °F) warm anomaly at 10 km altitude. Despite a final warning from the JTWC again for winds below gale-force a half of day later, Météo-France indicated that Ex-Enawo strengthened again during its extratropical transition, according to data from ships. The system became fully extratropical soon afterward, before dissipating late on 11 March.

== Preparations and impact ==
Costliest South-West Indian Ocean tropical cyclones
Rank	Tropical cyclones	Season	Damage
1	4 Chido	2024–25	$3.9 billion
2	4 Idai	2018–19	$3.3 billion
3	5 Freddy	2022–23	$1.53 billion
4	3 Garance	2024–25	$1.05 billion
5	4 Enawo	2016–17	$400 million
6	4 Kenneth	2018–19	$345 million
7	4 Leon–Eline	1999–00	$309 million
8	4 Dina	2001–02	$287 million
9	2 Belal	2023–24	$275 million
10	3 Kamisy	1983–84	$250 million
10	5 Gafilo	2003–04	$250 million

=== Madagascar ===
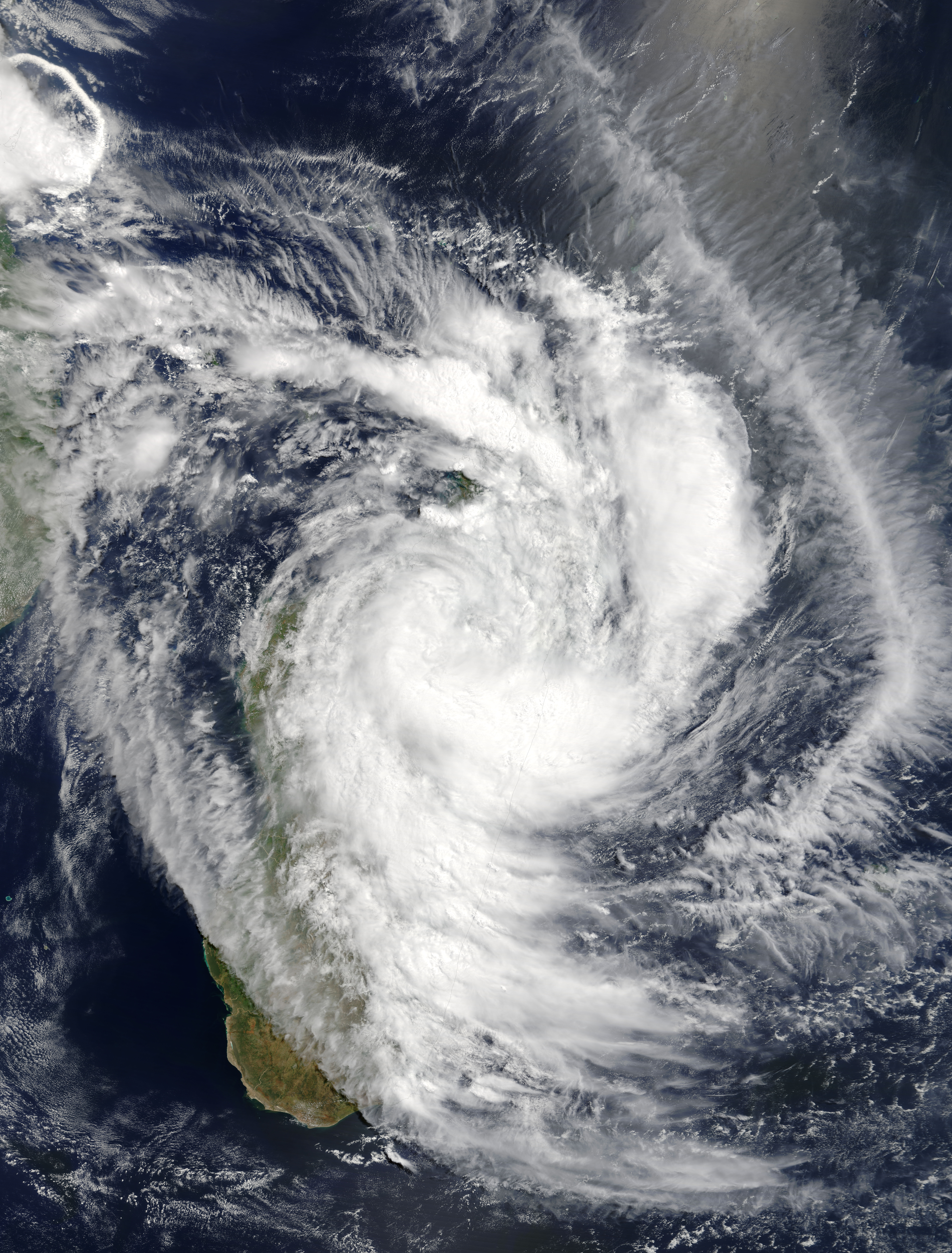
Enawo over Madagascar on 8 March

When Enawo attained intense tropical cyclone status, MFR warned of a significant storm surge of up to 3 to 4 m (9.8 to 13.1 ft), declaring the storm to have become "very dangerous". Accordingly, Meteo Madagascar issued a red alert for several regions expected to be impacted by the storm. The National Bureau of Risk and Disaster Management advised the evacuation of low-lying areas and the acquisition of supplies in advance of the storm. The Piroi regional center of the International Red Cross made preparations.

Enawo made landfall halfway between the towns of Sambava and Antalaha as an Intense Tropical Cyclone at approximately 09:30 UTC (12:30 a.m. local time) on 7 March. In the district of Maroantsetra, landslides and strong winds caused widespread infrastructural damage, which also rendered 500 people homeless. There, a landslide killed one adult and two children, in addition to injuring six others. The city of Antalaha was particularly hard hit, where the port became inaccessible and half the population was rendered homeless. Rice fields in Antalaha and Sambava districts were submerged after heavy rain and suffered severe losses. The Lohoko River burst its banks near Farahalana, inundating part of the town.

As of 17 March, 78 deaths have been reported across the country, with 18 other people reported missing. Total damages were estimated to be US$400 million, including $US207 million to the agricultural sector alone.

=== Réunion ===
Although the cyclone was not expected to bring direct impacts to Réunion, a storm surge warning was in effect for the northern part of the island due to swells of 2.5 to 5 m (8.2 to 16.4 ft) from the cyclone.

== See also ==
- Weather of 2016 and 2017
- Tropical cyclones in 2016 and 2017
- Cyclone Indlala
- Cyclone Ivan
- Cyclone Bingiza
- Cyclone Giovanna
- Cyclone Batsirai
