= Maïdo =

Mountain on the island of Réunion, France

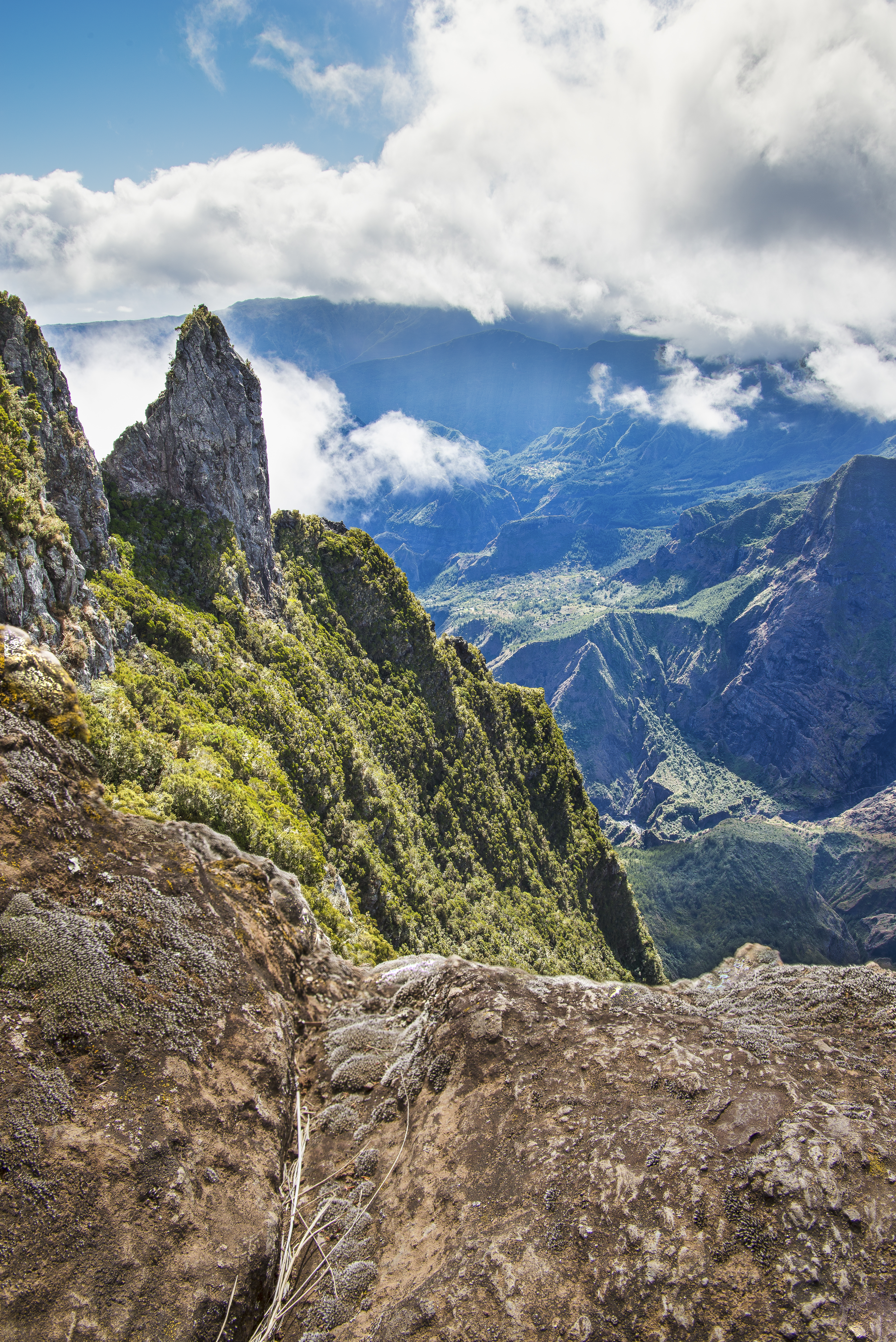
- Piton Maïdo

Highest point
- Elevation: 2,205 m (7,234 ft)
- Coordinates: 21°04′08″S 55°23′16″E

Naming
- Language of name: French

Geography
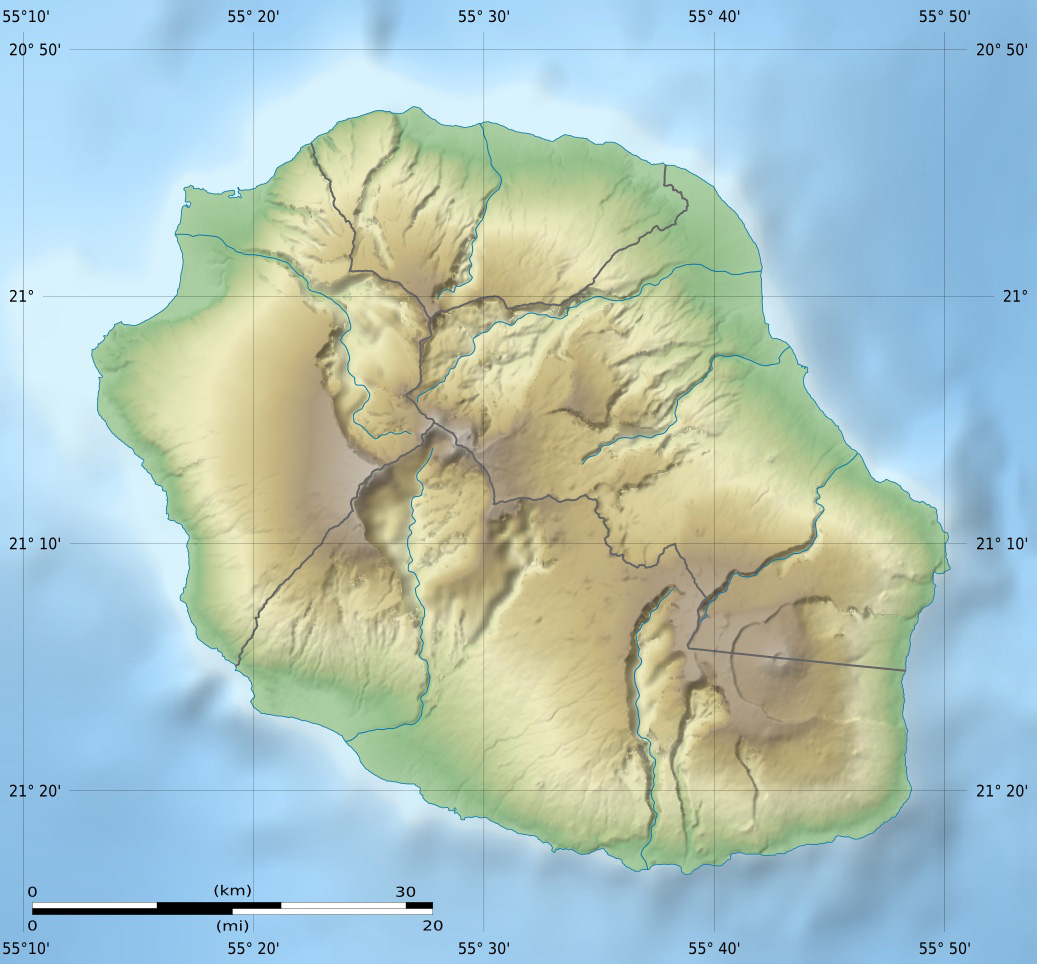
- Location within Réunion
- Location: Réunion, Indian Ocean

The Maïdo is a volcanic peak on the island of Réunion, located above the city of Saint Paul and overlooking the "Cirque de Mafate".

The road climbing from Saint Paul to Maïdo goes through a forest of highland tamarin, which is a popular area for family picnics.

== Climatology ==
An internationally renowned climatological station, the Maïdo atmospheric observatory, has been operating there since 2012. It depends on the Observatory of atmospheric physics in Reunion Island (OPAR), University of La Reunion.
