= Abela =

Abela is a surname.

Notable people with the surname include:

- Alexander Abela (born 1964), British-French filmmaker, producer and writer
- Anthony Abela (1954–2006), Maltese sociologist
- Carmelo Abela (born 1972), Maltese Labour MP
- Deborah Abela (born 1966), Australian children's writer
- Eduardo Abela (1889–1965), Cuban painter
- George Abela (born 1948), President of Malta from 2009 to 2014
- George S. Abela, clinician scientist, Professor of Medicine, Michigan State University
- Georgina Abela (born 1959), Maltese singer and musician
- Giovanni Francesco Abela (1582–1655), Maltese of noble birth, author of Malta illustrata
- Habib Abela, Maltese-Lebanese diplomat and merchant
- Joaquín Cuenca Abela, co-founder of Panoramio
- Jo Etienne Abela (born 1975), Maltese politician
- Lucas Abela, Australian noise musician
- Margaret Abela (born 1949), former First Lady of Malta
- Marisa Abela (born 1996), English actress
- Marlon Abela, Lebanese-born British restaurateur
- Matthew Abela (born 1999), Maltese badminton player
- Ray Abela, Maltese politician
- Robert Abela (born 1977), Prime Minister of Malta
- Toni Abela, Maltese judge
- Wistin Abela (1933–2014), Maltese politician

== See also ==
- Abella (surname)
- Abila (disambiguation)
- Avdella, a village in Greece sometimes known in Romanian as Abela
- Tropical Storm Abela (2016)
