= Cyclone Gombe =

South-West Indian Ocean cyclone in 2022

Tropical Cyclone Gombe
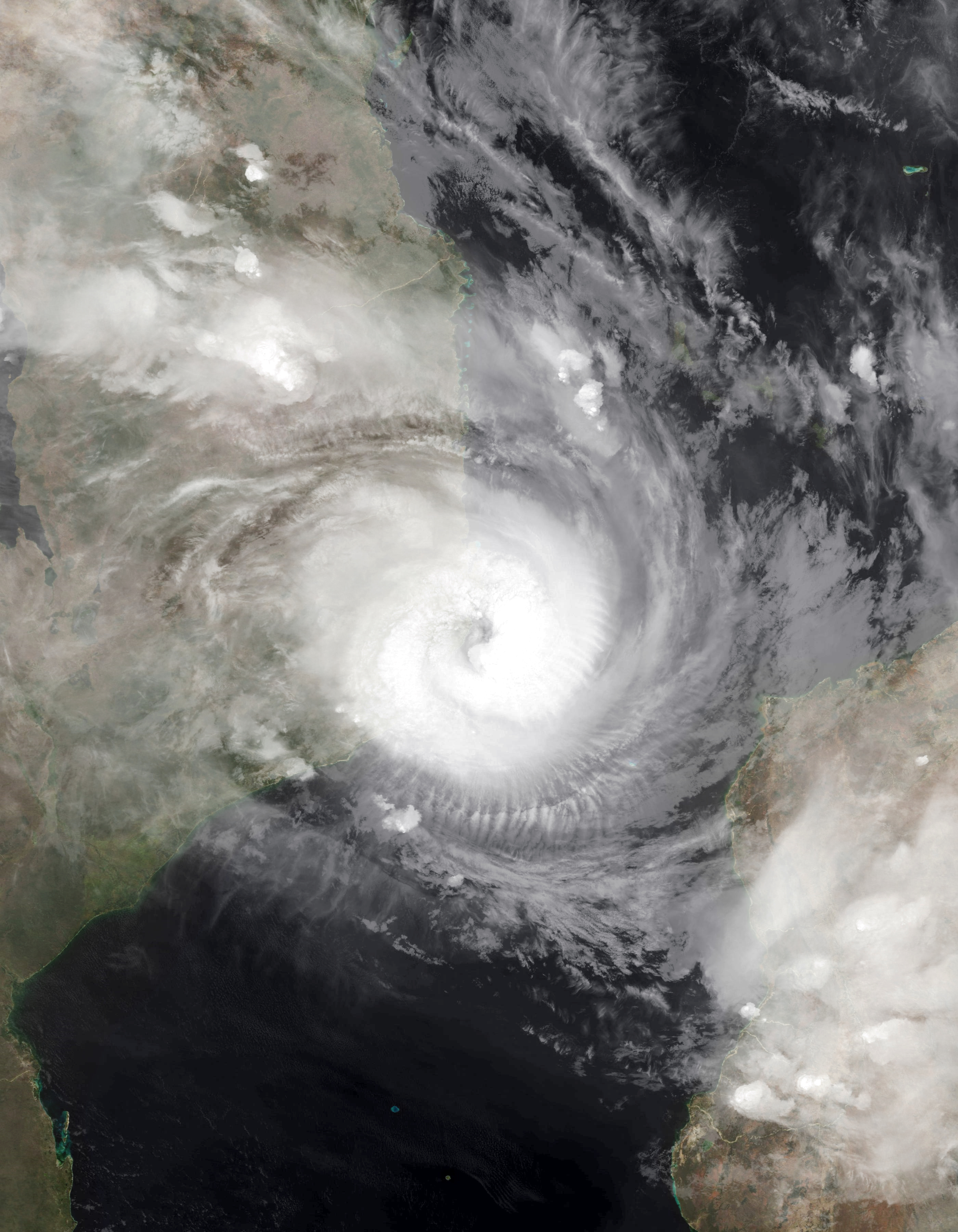
- Gombe making landfall in Mozambique at peak intensity on 10 March

Meteorological history
- Formed: 5 March 2022
- Dissipated: 17 March 2022

Tropical cyclone
- 10-minute sustained (MFR)
- Highest winds: 155 km/h (100 mph)
- Lowest pressure: 955 hPa (mbar); 28.20 inHg

Category 3-equivalent tropical cyclone
- 1-minute sustained (SSHWS/JTWC)
- Highest winds: 185 km/h (115 mph)
- Lowest pressure: 960 hPa (mbar); 28.35 inHg

Overall effects
- Fatalities: 72
- Damage: $99 million (2022 USD)
- Areas affected: Madagascar, Mozambique, Malawi
- Part of the 2021–22 South-West Indian Ocean cyclone season

Tropical Cyclone Gombe was a strong tropical cyclone that affected Mozambique. It became the first storm to make a major landfall in Nampula Province in Mozambique since Cyclone Jokwe in 2008. The eighth tropical storm, fourth tropical cyclone and fourth intense tropical cyclone of the 2021–22 South-West Indian Ocean cyclone season, Gombe originated from a tropical disturbance located off the coast of Madagascar. This area of convection was designated by the Joint Typhoon Warning Center as Invest 97S on 6 March. The next day, it began to slowly move westward and executed a loop as it became more organized, which prompted Météo-France Reunion (MFR) to note the system as Zone of Disturbed Weather 09. The system became a depression on 9 March, and became a moderate tropical storm the same day. Soon after being named, Gombe made landfall in Madagascar, and entered in the Mozambique Channel the next day. The storm continued its westward motion while slowly intensifying, and was upgraded to a Tropical Cyclone by the MFR on 10 March. Closing in on Nampula Province, the storm underwent rapid intensification, and was upgraded to the fourth Intense Tropical Cyclone of the year and reached its peak intensity on 11 march, with maximum 10-minute sustained winds of 165 km/h (105 mph), maximum 1-minute sustained winds of 185 km/h (115 mph), and a minimum central pressure of 960 hectopascals (28 inHg). The storm proceeded to make landfall, and quickly lost its convection over land. On 12 March, Gombe degenerated into a remnant low overland. However, the system subsequently turned southeastward and reemerged over water, before briefly regenerating into a tropical depression on 17 March. Gombe dissipated later that day.

Cyclone Gombe killed 72 people across three countries: 63 in Mozambique, 7 in Malawi, and 2 in Madagascar. Tens of thousands of homes were heavily damaged by the storm in Mozambique, and left hundreds of thousands of families without power across Nampula. Gombe affected thousands of hectares of crops, dropped 200 mm (7.9 in) of rain in 24 hours. The Island of Mozambique also experienced some damage from the storm. Aon estimated the damage caused by Gombe was US$99 million.

== Meteorological history ==
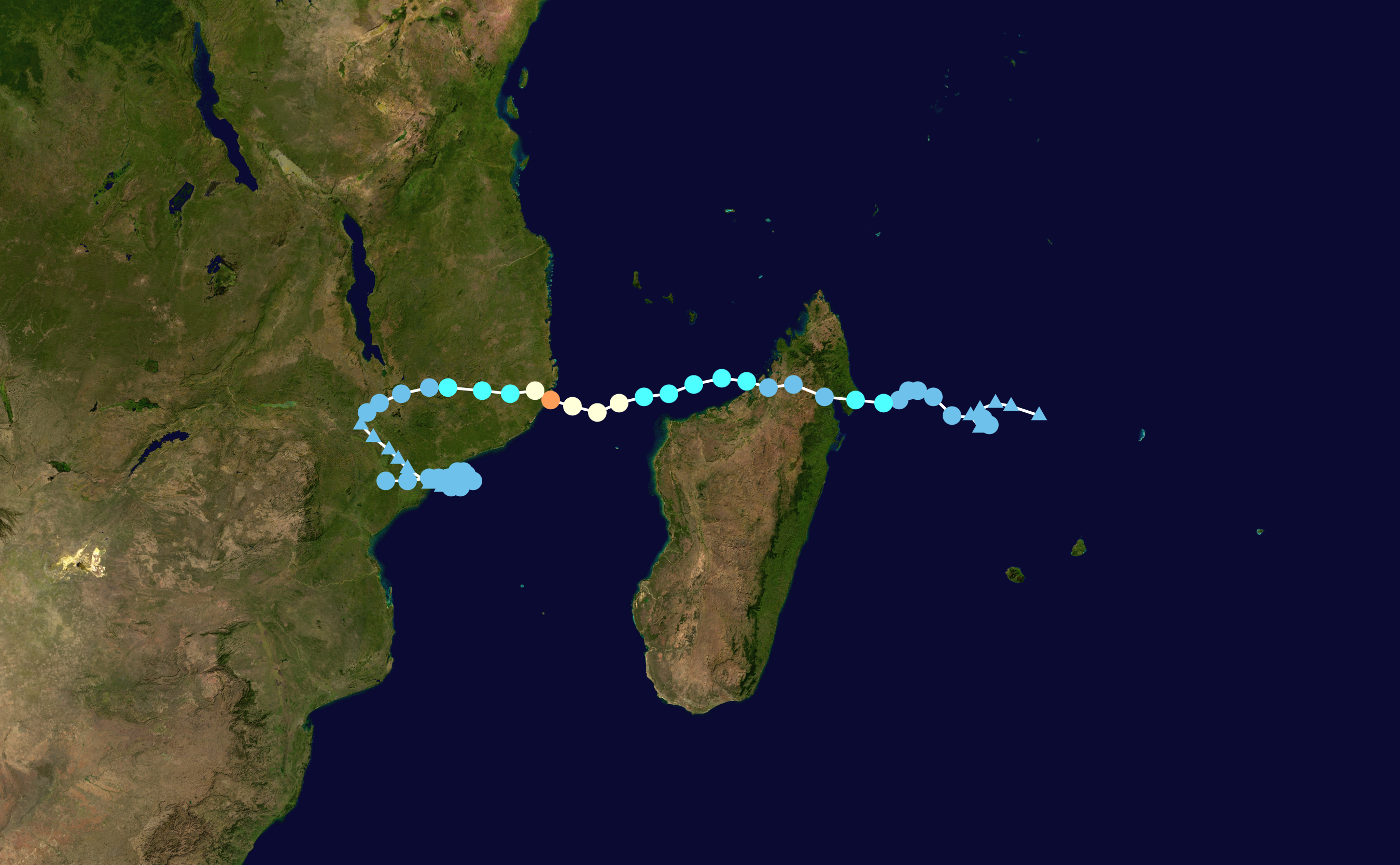
Map plotting the storm's track and intensity, according to the Saffir–Simpson scale Map key Saffir–Simpson scale Tropical depression (≤38 mph, ≤62 km/h) Tropical storm (39–73 mph, 63–118 km/h) Category 1 (74–95 mph, 119–153 km/h) Category 2 (96–110 mph, 154–177 km/h) Category 3 (111–129 mph, 178–208 km/h) Category 4 (130–156 mph, 209–251 km/h) Category 5 (≥157 mph, ≥252 km/h) Unknown Storm type Tropical cyclone Subtropical cyclone Extratropical cyclone, remnant low, tropical disturbance, or monsoon depression

Cyclone Gombe originated from a zone of disturbed weather that the Météo-France on Réunion (MFR) noted on 6 March, located about 280 nmi (320 mi; 520 km) from Mauritius, moving northeast slowly. The system organized its circulation and became active convectively, which prompted the Joint Typhoon Warning Center (JTWC) to designate the system as Invest 97S hours later, and at 11:40 UTC, issued a Tropical Cyclone Formation Alert (TCFA), noting warm sea surface temperatures of 28–29 °C (82–84 °F) along with low wind shear. As it executed a counterclockwise loop, the MFR upgraded the storm to a tropical depression at noon on 7 March, and upgraded it to a moderate tropical storm; the Mauritius Meteorological Services named it Gombe. (Note: The Sub-Regional Tropical Cyclone Advisory Center (Mauritius Meteorological Services) in Mauritius names a storm if the system intensifies into a moderate tropical storm between 55° E and 90° E.) The JTWC followed suit, and classified it as Tropical Cyclone 19S at 18:00 UTC that day.

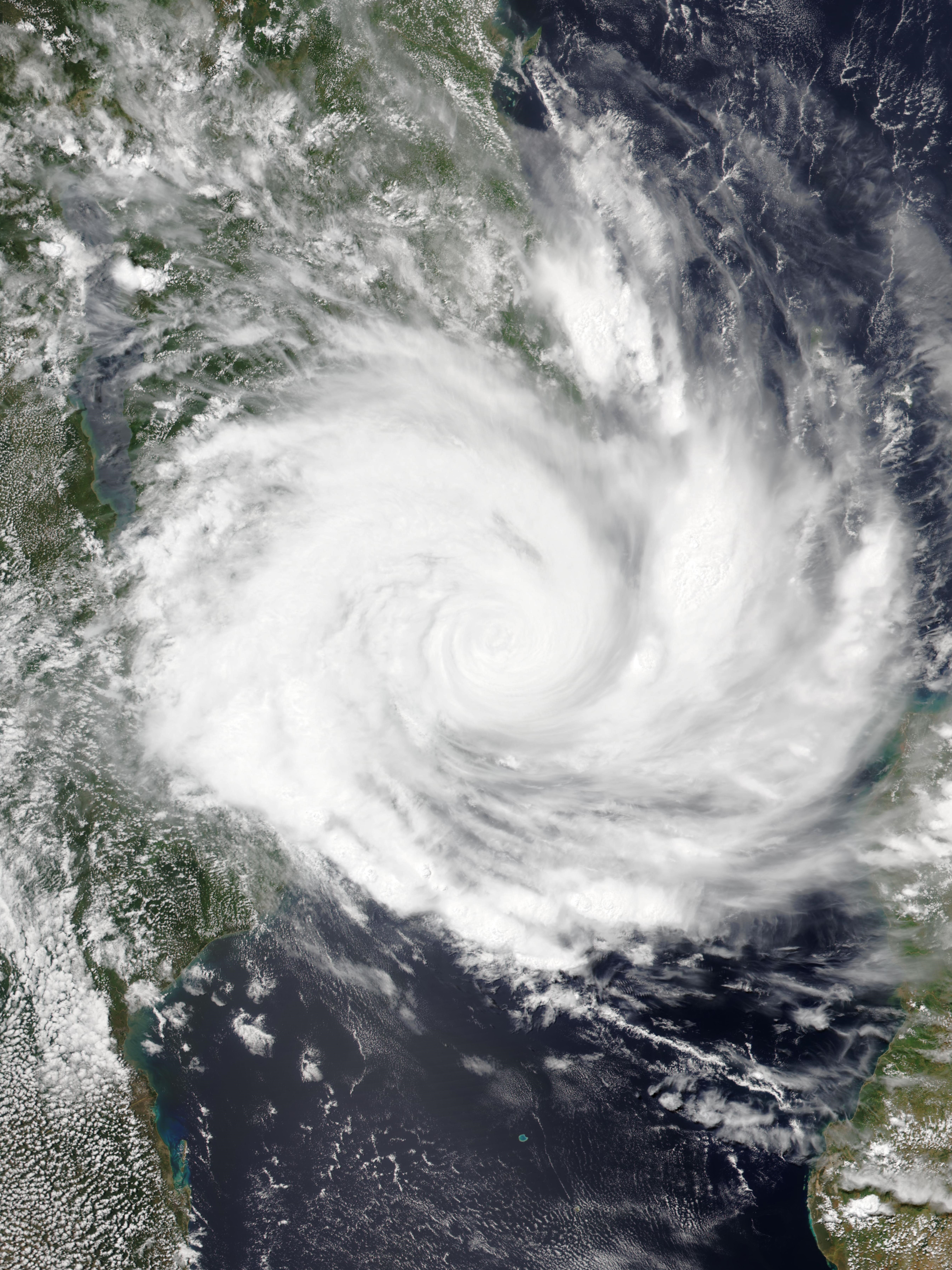
Tropical Cyclone Gombe after its landfall in Mozambique on 11 March

On 8 March, Gombe made landfall in the Sava Region of Madagascar, and the MFR downgraded the system to an overland depression at 06:00 UTC while it crossed the country, and the JTWC downgraded it to a tropical depression as well. 24 hours later, the system reached the Mozambique Channel, moving westward at 7 knots (13 km/h; 8.1 mph), and the MFR upgraded it back to a tropical storm at 06:00 UTC on 9 March, with 10-minute sustained winds of 45 knots (83 km/h; 52 mph). Gombe, driven by a subtropical ridge south of the Channel, continued to move westward, and the MFR observed an improved cloud pattern, upgrading it to a Tropical Cyclone at 06:00 UTC on 10 March, estimating maximum 10-minute sustained winds of 65 knots (120 km/h; 75 mph). Gombe then began a period rapid intensification, and the MFR upgraded the storm to Intense Tropical Cyclone, with peak 10-minute sustained winds of 90 knots (170 km/h; 100 mph), and a minimum central pressure of 960 hPa (28.34 inHg) midnight on 11 March. At the same time, the JTWC estimated peak 1-minute sustained winds of 100 knots (190 km/h; 120 mph), which made it a Category 3 cyclone on the Saffir-Simpson scale - the storm strengthened approximately 35 knots (65 km/h; 40 mph) within 18 hours.

The storm made landfall in Nampula Province of Mozambique, the first major cyclone to do so since Cyclone Jokwe of 2008, and subsequently weakened significantly. The MFR downgraded the storm to an Overland Depression for the second time on 06:00 UTC the same day, with the JTWC tagging the system as a high-end Category 1-equivalent. The storm continued to move inland into Mozambique, and the MFR issued their last advisory on Gombe a day later, and the JTWC issued their final advisory at 18:00 UTC on 12 March. In the advisory released on 17 March by the MFR, what was left of Gombe reorganized itself into a tropical depression as its entered Mozambique channel. However, later that same day, the MFR issued their final advisory on Gombe.

== Preparations ==
=== Mozambique ===
Red warnings were issued for Nampula and Zambezia provinces as the storm neared. Several establishments and institutions were closed prior to the storms arrival. Storm surge of 1–2 meters was forecasted along the coast, with the highest rainfall accumulations being over 600 mm (2.0 ft). CARE International prepared response efforts with the National Institute for Disaster Management. Approximately 55,000 people were exposed to fluvial flooding.

== Impact ==
Cyclone Gombe making landfall in Nampula Province in Mozambique on 11 March

=== Mozambique ===
The storm made landfall near where Tropical Storm Ana had struck only six weeks prior, which worsened the storm's lasting effects. Several districts remained inaccessible for days after Gombe.

In Nampula Province, heavy winds uprooted trees and ripped roofs off of various public buildings. Electricity and mobile phone services were disrupted, which made communication in impact areas difficult. In Zambezia Province, the bridge connecting the administrative posts of Mulela and Nabur to the village of Pebane collapsed. This left 32,000 people isolated from the posts, and caused scarcities in sanitation, food, and water. In a preliminary satellite estimate, about 3,180 hectares of land were flooded.

Across the country, at least 500,000 people have been affected by Gombe. A total of 45,079 houses have been completely destroyed, two bridges collapsed, and 41 health units were severely affected. 691 classrooms in 301 schools have been damaged in the country, affecting over 75,607 students and 1,221 teachers. More than 300,000 families within 20 districts of Nampula province experienced power outages. On the Island of Mozambique, six people died and several centuries-old trees were uprooted. Some roads were completely stripped away by the storm. Gombe affected around 7,000 people on the island, and impacted 5,500 houses. 100 classrooms were damaged there, affecting 13,000 pupils, and flooded 2,800 hectares of crops. Quelimane received 218 mm (8.59 in) of rainfall within 24 hours.

In the Mossuril District, Lunga was heavily affected and unreachable by land for a long time.

Preliminary data stated that around 1,600 temporary relief shelters set up for the aftermath of Gombe were damaged, some blown away and destroyed, with the majority left in need of repair. The cyclone left over 23,994 people displaced, and severely damaged 2,741 electric poles, and 707 km (439 mi) of roads. Nationwide, 736,015 people were directly affected by Cyclone Gombe; 63 people died and 108 suffered injuries. A tropical cyclone model estimated the damage at US$81.9 million.

=== Elsewhere ===
In Malawi, heavy rain and infrastructure damage was reported. At least 7 people have died in the country; with one in the Mangochi District being a 28-year-old man who was washed away by a flooding river. The cyclone reportedly caused "heavy damage" in 10 districts, mostly in the southern portions of the country. A police station, an immigration office, and other buildings were submerged in floodwaters in Mulanje District, with cut-off roads in other areas hampering communication and rescue efforts.

In Madagascar, at least two people died and one person reported missing.

== Aftermath ==
=== Mozambique ===
39 centers for 23,994 displaced people were opened by the National Institute for Disaster Risk Reduction and Management, and about 360 tons of essential items were distributed right after the storm passed. These centers were built with Adobe, which cannot withstand heavy rains. Health care workers reported increased cases of malaria and waterborne diseases amongst those affected. The storm also greatly affected those impacted by the ongoing humanitarian crisis in the northern section of the country, and immediate resources could only support an estimated 100,000 people.

== See also ==
- Weather of 2022
- Tropical cyclones in 2022
- List of South-West Indian Ocean intense tropical cyclones
- Cyclone Jokwe (2008) - Affected the same area in Mozambique with a similar intensity
- Cyclone Idai (2019) – the second deadliest tropical cyclone recorded In the Southern Hemisphere
- Cyclone Eloise (2021)
- Tropical Storm Ana (2022) - Had a similar track to Gombe
