= Abella (disambiguation) =

Abella was a 14th-century physician.

Abella may also refer to:

- Abella (surname)
- Abella, Iran, a village in East Azerbaijan Province, Iran
- Abella Center, a community, city and shopping village in San Pablo, California
- Abella, Latin name of Avella, town in Italy
- Abella, a synonym of the moth genus Porela
