= Abella (surname) =

Abella is a Spanish and French surname. Notable people with the surname include:

- Alicia Abella, American engineer
- Carlos Abella (born 1986), Colombian footballer
- Damià Abella (born 1982), Spanish footballer
- Irving Abella (1940–2022), Canadian writer
- José Abella (born 1994), Mexican football player
- Rosalie Abella (born 1946), Canadian Supreme Court jurist
- Isaac Abella (1934–2016), Canadian physicist

== See also ==
- Abela (surname)
