= Anthony Abela =

20th century Maltese philosopher

- Born: 1954; Floriana, Malta
- Died: 4 April 2006 (aged 52); Malta
- Education: Centre Sèvres; University of Malta
- Occupation: Philosophy

Anthony Abela (1954–2006) was a major Maltese sociologist. He mostly specialised in values.

== Life ==
Abela was born at Floriana, Malta, in 1954. He began his studies at the University of Malta, from which he acquired a Bachelor of Arts in Philosophy (1976), and pursued further studies at the Gregorian University in Rome, Italy, from which he acquired a bachelor's degree in Theology (1982). He also studied at the Centre Sèvres in Paris, France, from which he acquired a master's degree in Theology (1984); at the Loyola University of Chicago, U.S. (1987); and at the University of Oxford, England, from which he acquired a doctorate in Sociology (1990).

He began teaching at the University of Malta in 1985, and in 1990, taught at the Gregorian University in Rome. He was principal investigator of the European Values Study in Malta, Member of the European Values Steering Committee at Tilburg in the Netherlands, and served as Evaluator and Reviewer of social research projects for the European Commission. He was also the Non-Governmental Maltese Expert on Poverty and Social Inclusion for the European Commission. For three years he was director of the Institute of Social Welfare at the University of Malta.

His research interests included comparative European values studies, sociology of the family, sociology of religion, youth, gender, poverty, and social policy. Until his premature death on April 4, 2006, at the relatively young age of 52, he was an associate professor of Sociology and Social Policy.

== Works ==
Books

- 1991 - Transmitting Values in European Malta
- 1992 - Changing Youth Culture in Malta
- 1994 - Shifting Family Values in Malta
- 1996 - Il-Harsien Socjali fis-Snin Disghin (Social Welfare in the 1990s)
- 1998 - Women and Men in the Maltese Islands
- 1998 - Gender Issues and Statistics (ed.)
- 1998 - Secularised Sexuality: Youth Values in a City-island
- 1999 - European Values Study
- 2000 - Young Catholics at the New Millennium
- 2001 - Values of Women and Men in the Maltese Islands: A comparative European Perspective
- 2001 - Youth Participation in Voluntary Organisations and Women's Welfare in Society

Chapters in books

- 1994 - ‘Values for Malta’s Future’, in Maltese Society: A Sociological Inquiry, ed. by R.G. Sultana and G. Baldacchino, pp. 253-270
- 1994 - ‘Drug Abuse Among School Children’, in Maltese Society: A Sociological Inquiry, ed. by R.G. Sultana and G. Baldacchino, pp. 669-684
- 1994 - ‘Religjon u Identità’ (Religion and Identity), in Kungress dwar l-Identità Maltija (Congress on Maltese Identity), PIN Publications, Malta, pp. 53-73
- 1995 - ‘Family and Social Values in Europe and Malta’, in The Malta Year Book 1995, ed. by S.J.A. Clews. De La Salle Brothers, Malta, pp. 487-491
- 1995 - ‘Fundamentalist Religious Values of Young People in Malta’, in Fundamentalism and Youth in Europe, ed. by L. Omasi. Franco Angeli Editore, Milan, pp. 43-62
- 1998 - ‘Feminization of Poverty’, in Gender Issues and Statistics. Department for the Rights of Women, Ministry of Social Policy, Malta.

Other

- 1999 - ‘Values 2000’ Department of Information, Malta

== See also ==
- Philosophy in Malta
