= 2016–17 South-West Indian Ocean cyclone season =

Cyclone season in the Southwest Indian Ocean

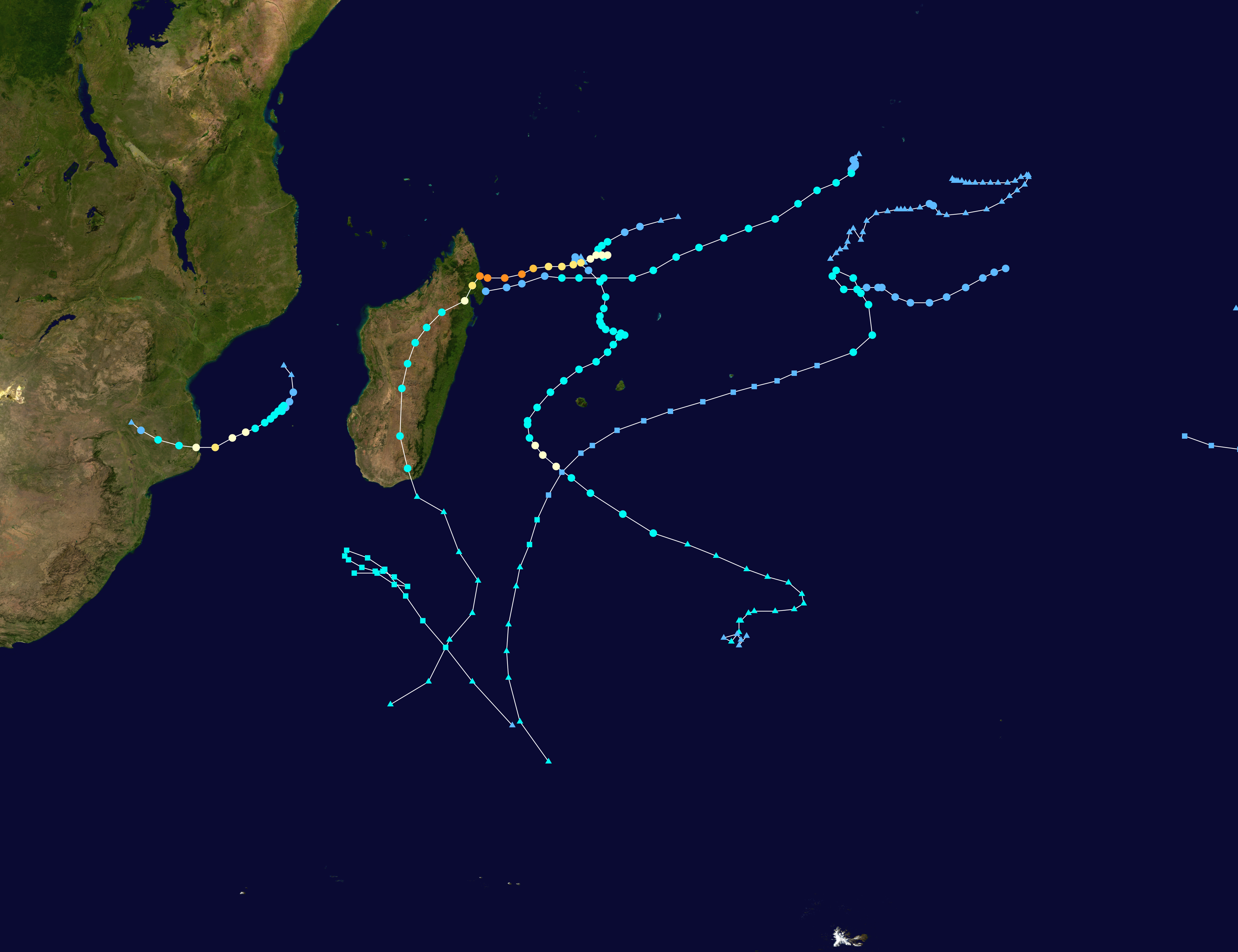
- Season summary map

Seasonal boundaries
- First system formed: July 15, 2016
- Last system dissipated: March 14, 2017

Strongest storm
- Name: Enawo
  - Maximum winds: 205 km/h (125 mph) (10-minute sustained)
  - Lowest pressure: 932 hPa (mbar)

Seasonal statistics
- Total disturbances: 7, 1 unofficial
- Total depressions: 7
- Total storms: 5
- Tropical cyclones: 3
- Intense tropical cyclones: 1
- Very intense tropical cyclones: 0
- Total fatalities: 356 total
- Total damage: $617 million (2017 USD) (Fifth-costliest South-West Indian Ocean cyclone season on record)

Related articles
- 2016–17 Australian region cyclone season; 2016–17 South Pacific cyclone season

The 2016–17 South-West Indian Ocean cyclone season was a below-average season, with five tropical storms, three of which intensified into tropical cyclones. It officially began on November 15, 2016, and ended on April 30, 2017, with the exception for Mauritius and the Seychelles, for which it ended on May 15, 2017. These dates conventionally delimit the period of each year when most tropical and subtropical cyclones form in the basin, which is west of 90°E and south of the Equator. Tropical and subtropical cyclones in this basin were monitored by the Regional Specialised Meteorological Centre in Réunion, though the Joint Typhoon Warning Center issued unofficial advisories.

== Seasonal forecasts ==
On November 4, the Mauritius Meteorological Services (MMS) released their summer 2016–17 outlook. It is expected that six to eight cyclones will form in the Southwest Indian Ocean throughout the season from November through the first half of May. This is in addition to the two cyclones, Abela and Bransby, that formed before the outlook period. MMS also indicated that the region south of Diego Garcia would be a center of focus for cyclone formation.

== Seasonal summary ==
Despite a weak season, the first named tropical cyclone, Abela formed early on July 15. A subtropical depression formed after three months. There were no tropical cyclones in the basin in November, December or January.

== Systems ==
=== Severe Tropical Storm Abela ===
- Severe tropical storm (MFR)
- Tropical storm (SSHWS)
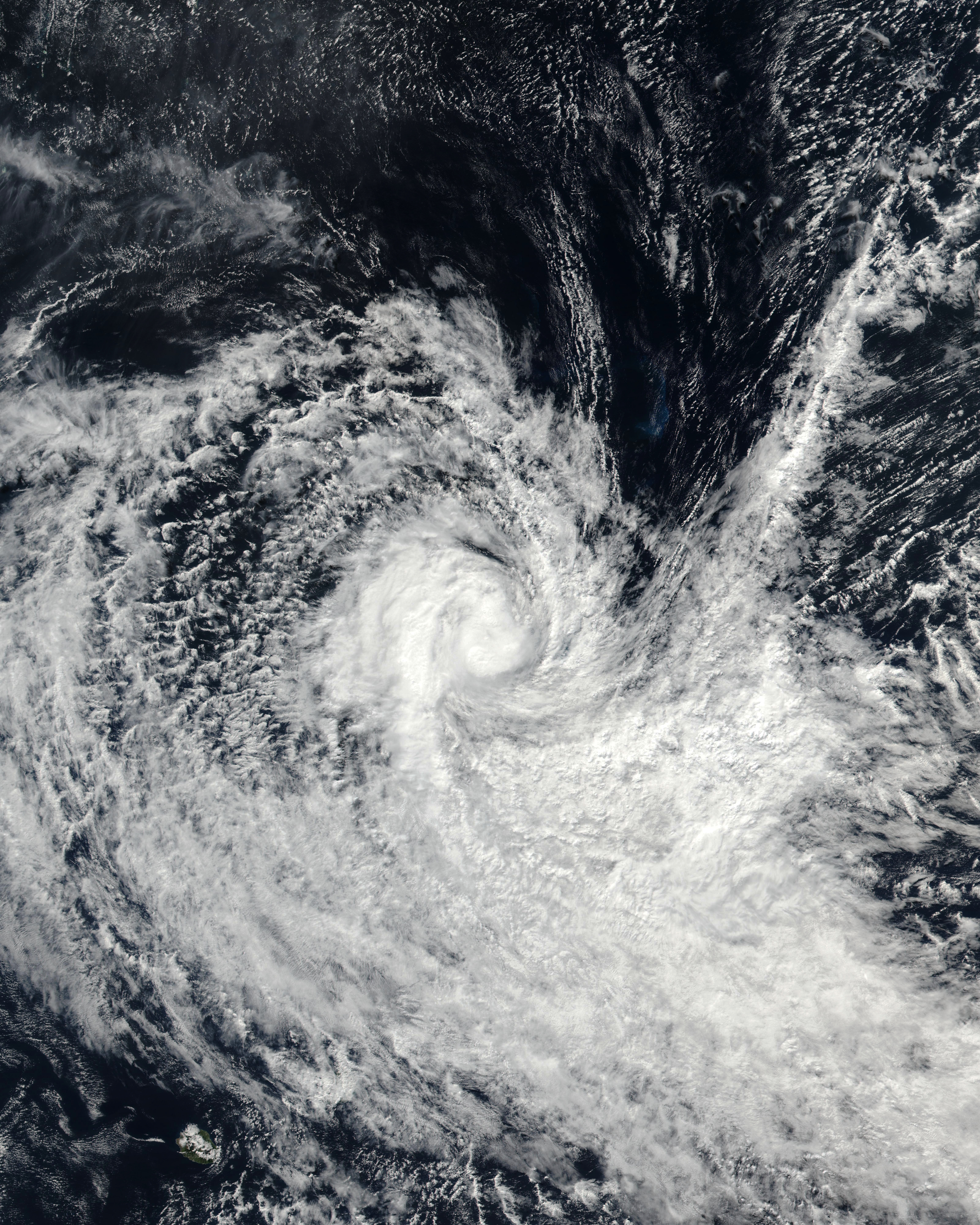
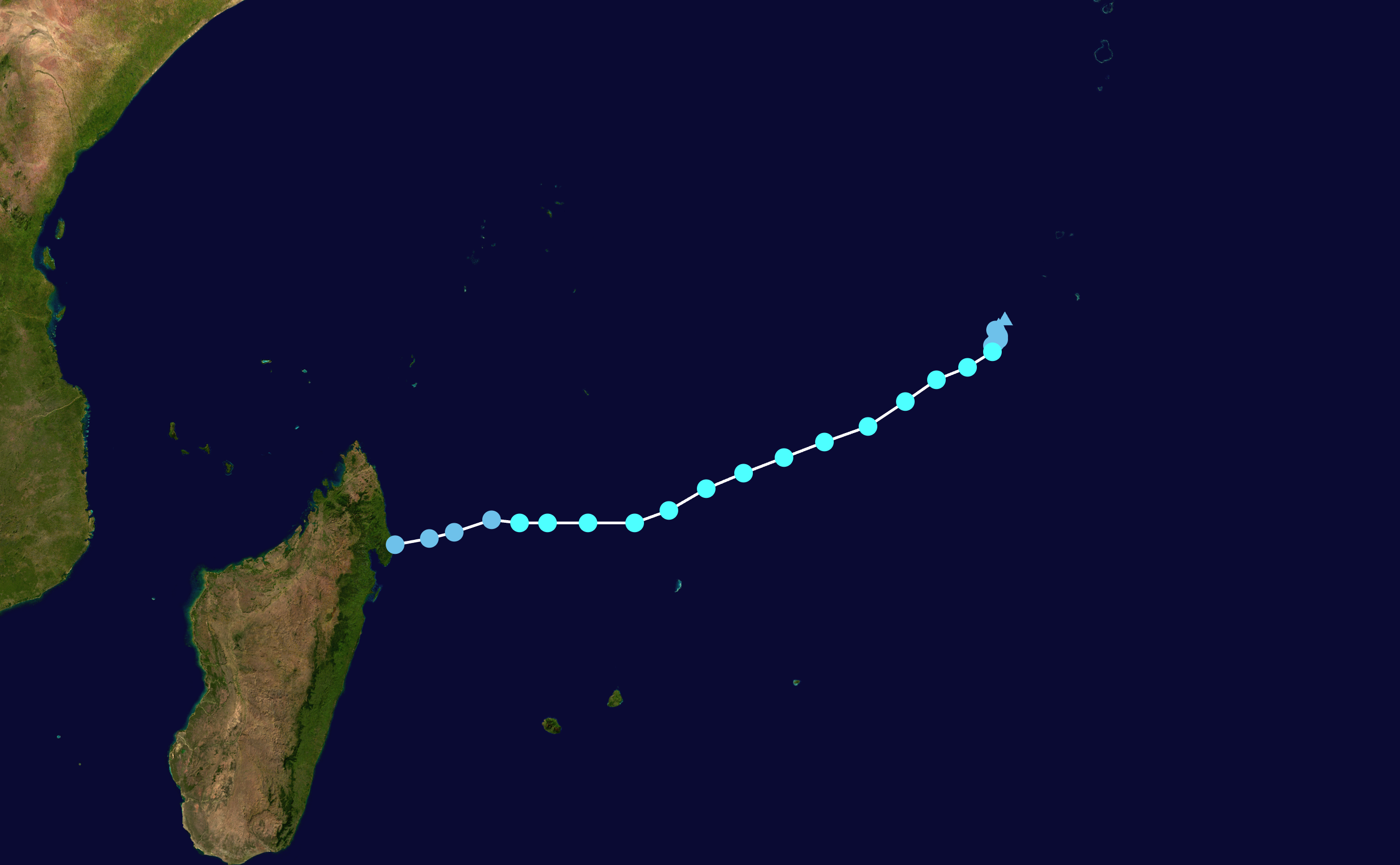
- Duration: July 15 – July 19
- Peak intensity: 95 km/h (60 mph) (10-min); 987 hPa (mbar)

On July 15, a tropical depression formed to the southwest of Diego Garcia. This marked only the fourth occurrence of a tropical cyclone existing in the southwest Indian Ocean during the month of July, with the others being 1971, Tropical Depression M2 in 1997 and Tropical Cyclone 01U in July 2007. The next day, the depression acquired moderate tropical storm status as gale-force winds extended more than halfway around the center. The system tracked west-southwest, organizing slowly in the face of moderate vertical wind shear. On the evening of July 17, RSMC La Réunion initiated warnings on the storm after a scatterometer pass revealed 75 km/h (45 mph) winds. At the same time, Mauritius Meteorological Services named the storm Abela. The small system briefly attained severe tropical storm strength the next day as a low-level eye developed. Abela began to weaken quickly in the subsequent hours as it moved into a region with cool sea surface temperatures and low oceanic potential. Abela became a remnant low on July 20 as it neared the coast of Madagascar.

=== Subtropical Depression Bransby ===
- Subtropical depression (MFR)
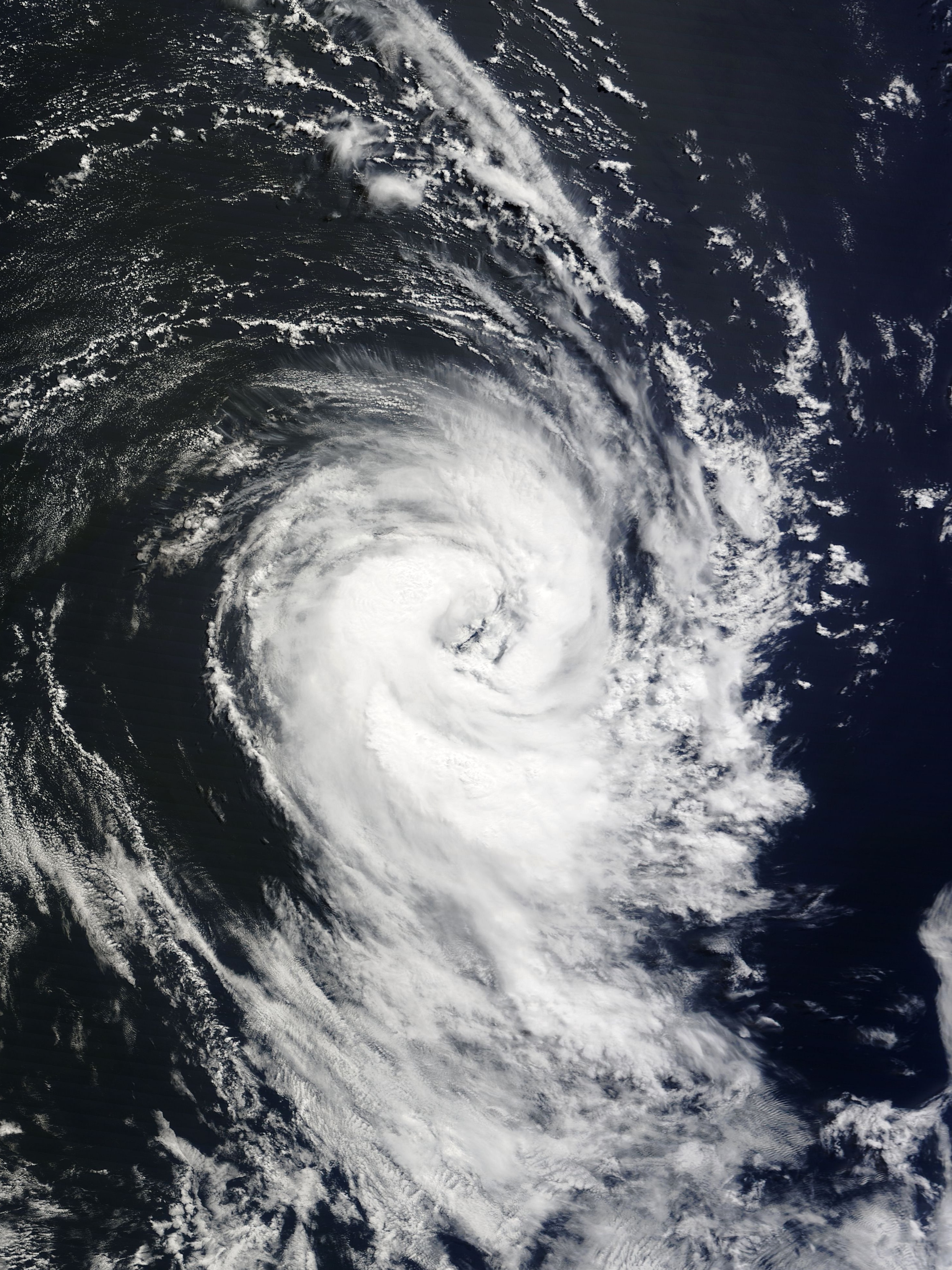
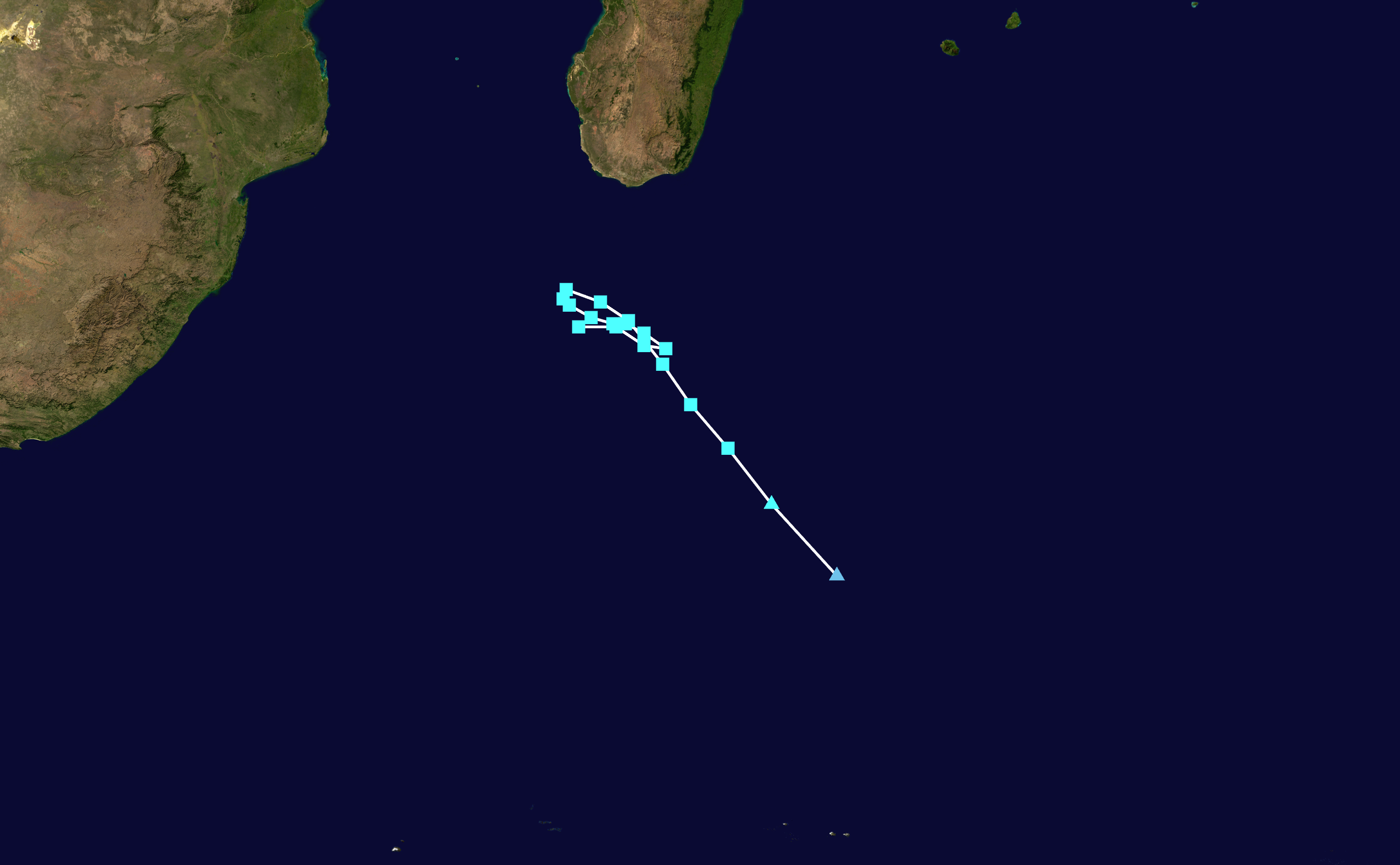
- Duration: October 3 – October 6
- Peak intensity: 100 km/h (65 mph) (10-min); 987 hPa (mbar)

A zone of disturbed weather developed into a subtropical depression to the south of Madagascar on October 2. The subtropical depression was analysed in post-analysis to have developed peak winds of 95 km/h (60 mph) on October 3. The system slowly weakened as it executed an anticyclonic loop until it had winds of 75 km/h (45 mph) early on October 5, when RSMC La Réunion began to operationally warn on the system and Direction Generale de la Meteorologie (DGM) of Madagascar named it Bransby. Bransby went unmonitored by the Joint Typhoon Warning Center until the next day. The storm continued to weaken throughout the day until it was barely producing gale-force winds. The next day, Bransby developed a defined banding eye as it re-intensified and accelerated to the southeast. Six hours later, Bransby reattained its peak intensity. RSMC La Réunion noted that Bransby had once again developed winds of 95 km/h (60 mph), equivalent to that of the severe tropical storm rating given to tropical cyclones of the same intensity. Throughout the evening of October 6, the organization of Bransby deteriorated rapidly as northwesterly wind shear took its toll, resulting in rapid weakening. On October 7, Bransby became a remnant low with an elongated circulation devoid of convection while moving over 16 °C waters.

=== Tropical Depression 03 ===
- Tropical depression (MFR)
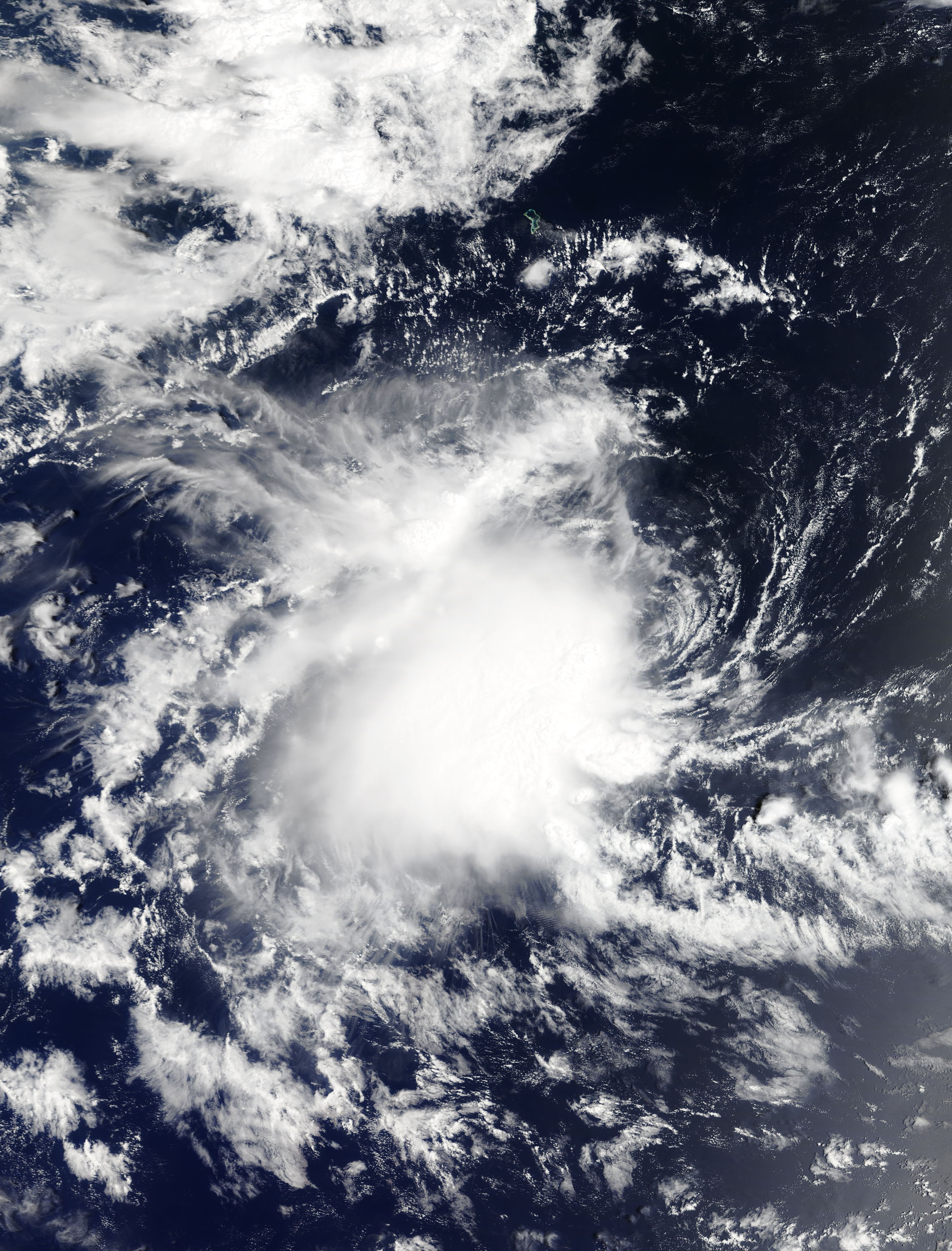
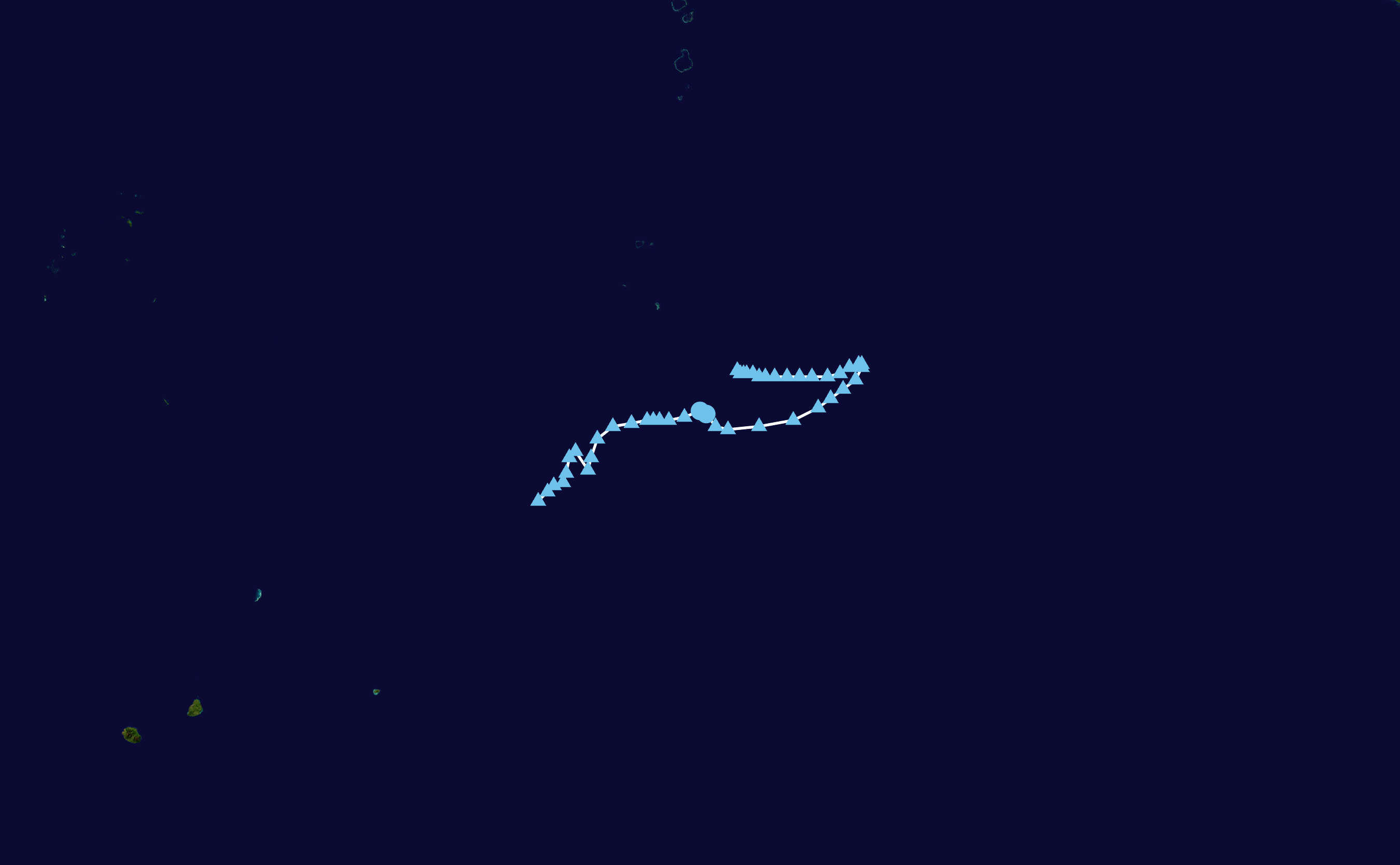
- Duration: January 27 – January 28
- Peak intensity: 55 km/h (35 mph) (10-min); 1005 hPa (mbar)

A tropical disturbance developed in the Indian Ocean on January 27. The system rapidly developed, and Météo-France upgraded the system to a depression six hours later. The system was short-lived; the depression would later weaken and Météo-France discontinued advisories for the system on January 28.

=== Tropical Cyclone Carlos ===
- Tropical cyclone (MFR)
- Category 1 tropical cyclone (SSHWS)
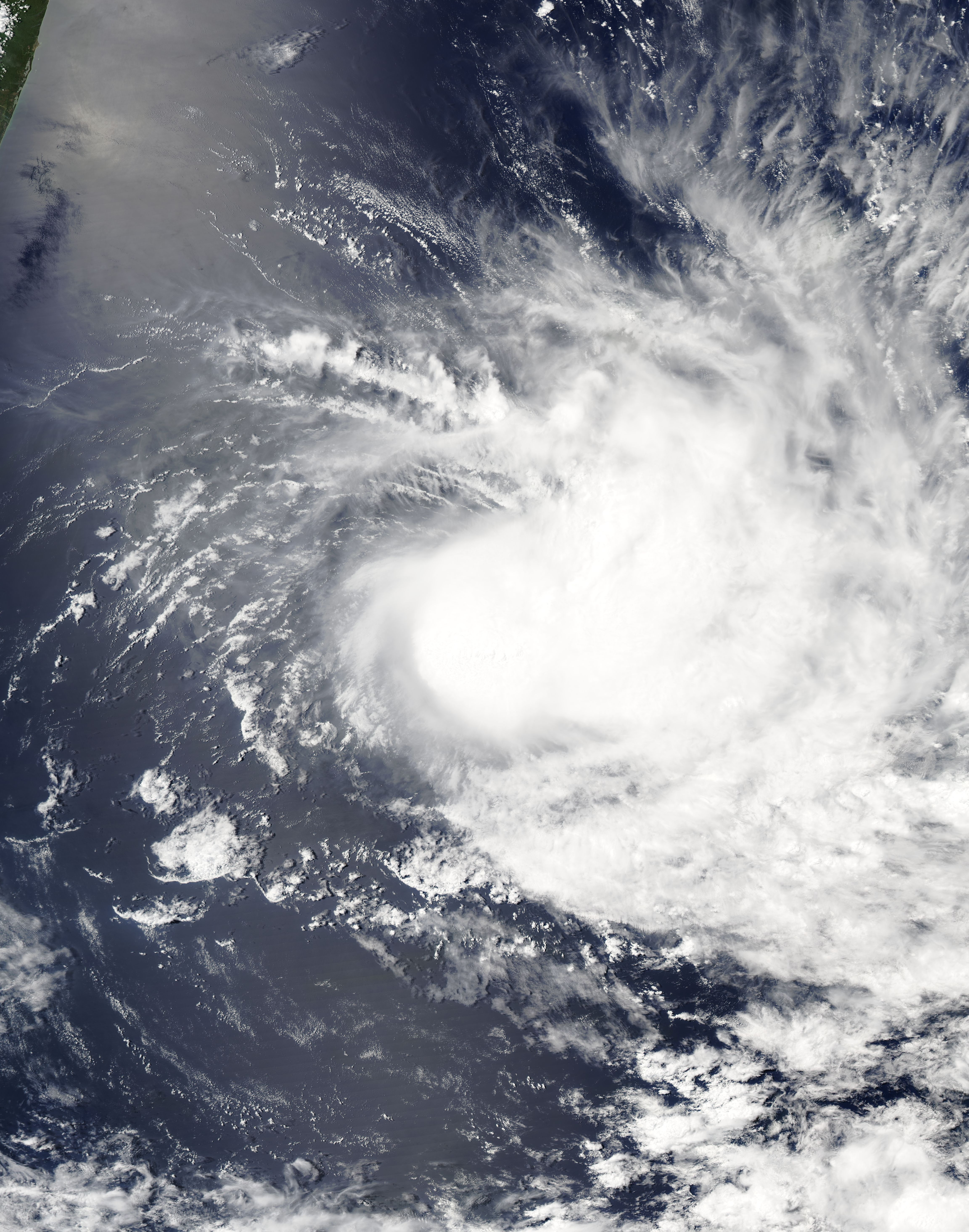
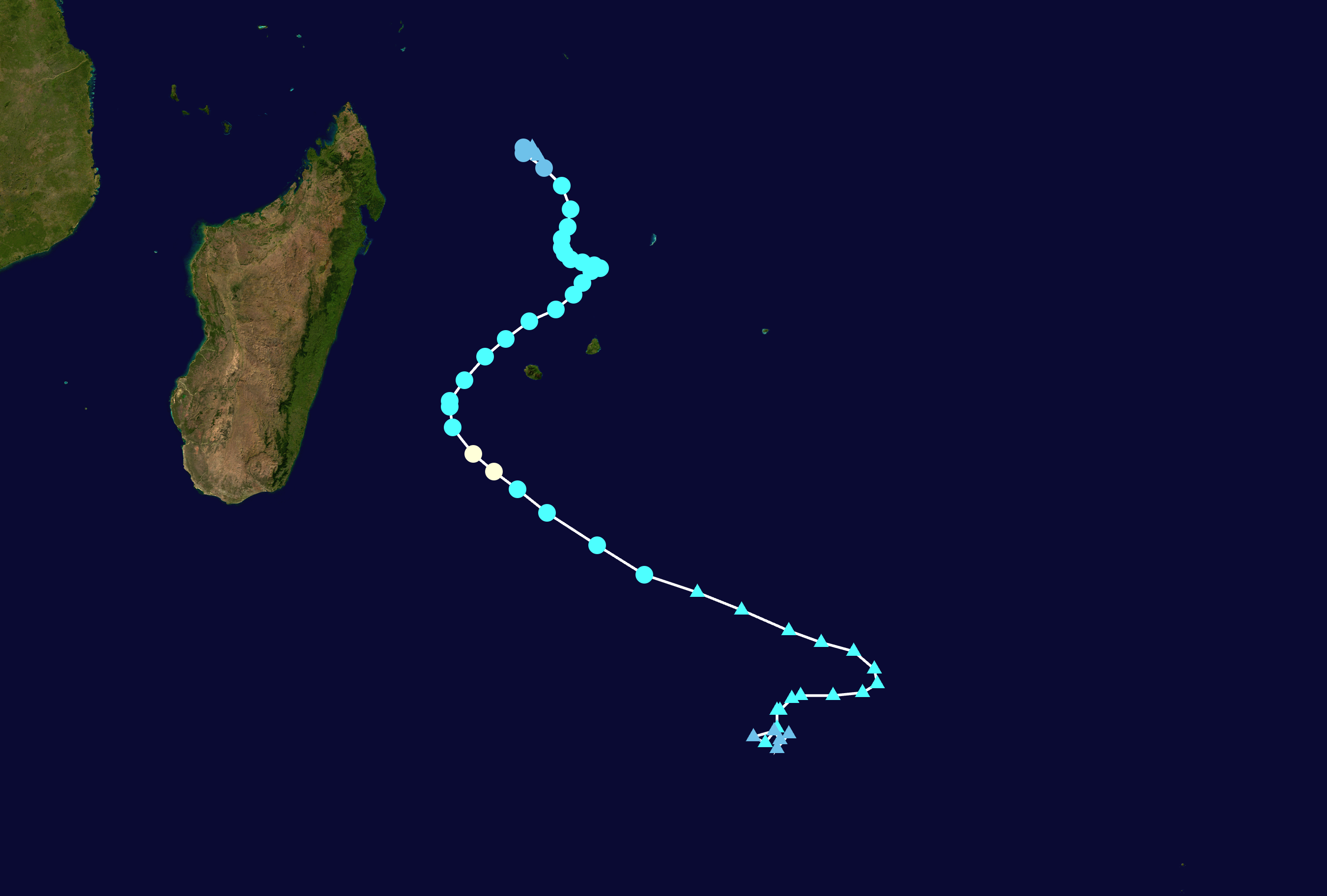
- Duration: February 3 – February 10
- Peak intensity: 130 km/h (80 mph) (10-min); 965 hPa (mbar)

A tropical disturbance formed to the north of Mauritius on January 27. Over the next few days, it gradually organized under low to moderate shear, until Météo-France upgraded the disturbance to a depression. 12 hours later, the agency further upgraded the system, naming it 'Carlos'. The JTWC would follow suit at the same time, designating it as '04S'. Carlos intensified further until Météo-France upgraded Carlos to a severe tropical storm; the system would later weaken, becoming exposed on February 6. Then, Carlos reintensified; the storm would later peak on February 9, with sustained winds of 70 knots and a pressure of 965 mb. Afterwards, Carlos rapidly weakened below category 1 strength, then undergo extratropical transition, a process that will be completed by February 10. Both agencies would monitor the extratropical system until Carlos completely dissipated by February 13.

=== Tropical Cyclone Dineo ===
- Tropical cyclone (MFR)
- Category 2 tropical cyclone (SSHWS)
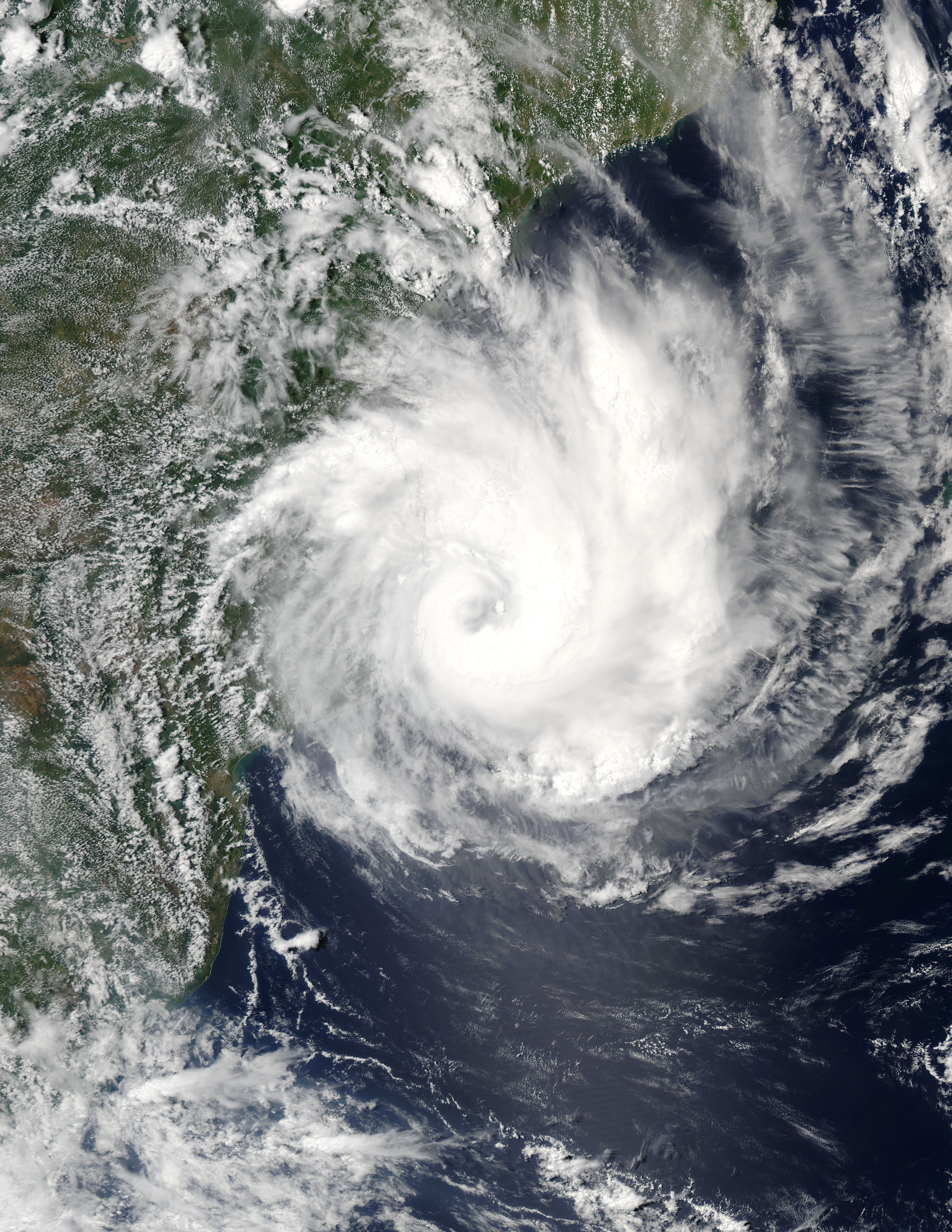
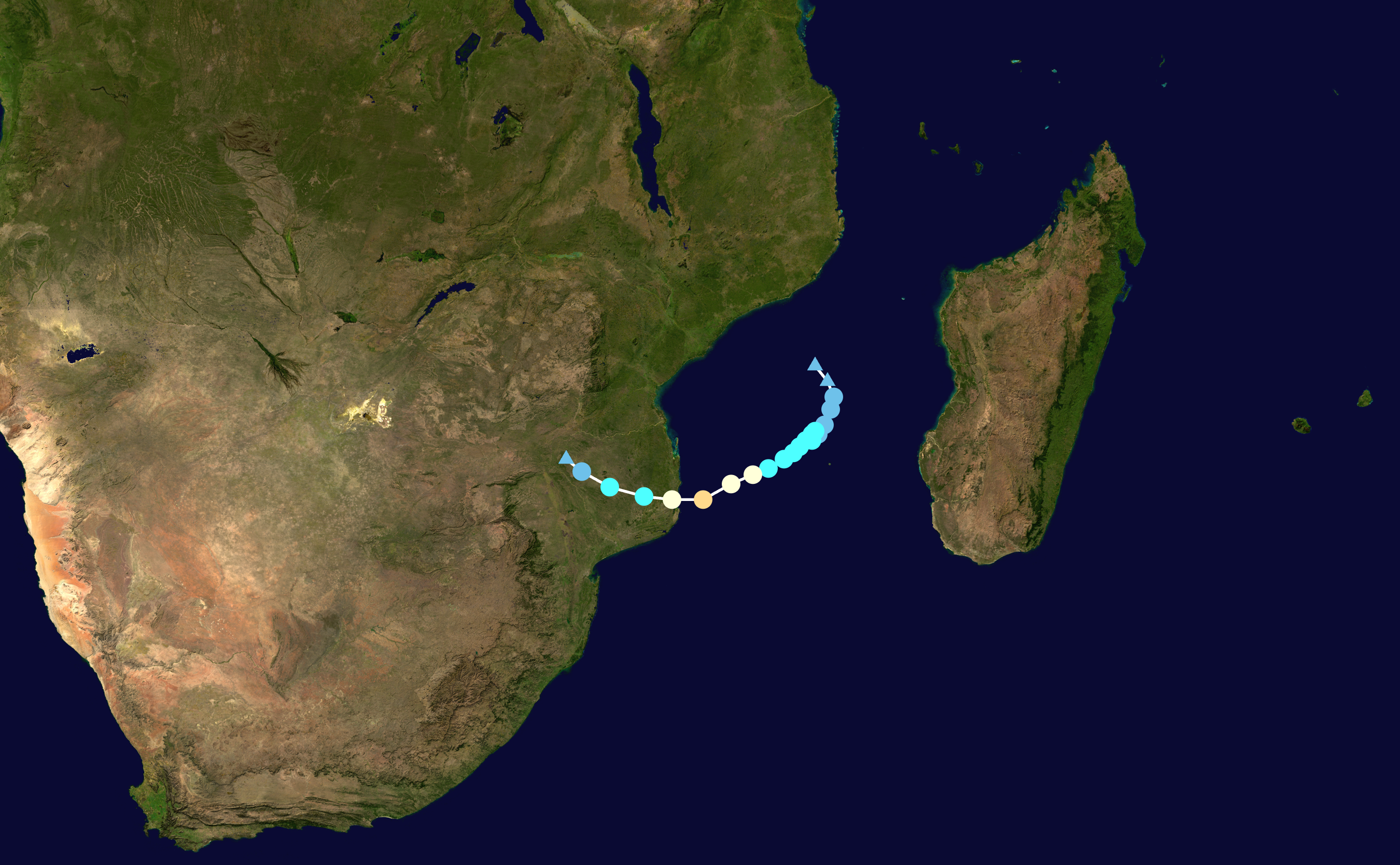
- Duration: February 13 – February 17
- Peak intensity: 140 km/h (85 mph) (10-min); 955 hPa (mbar)

The origins of Dineo can be tracked back to a cluster of thunderstorms that organized into an area of low pressure in the Mozambique Channel on February 11. Over the next two days, the system gradually drifted in a generally southern track as it gained intensity and prompted the JTWC to issue a TCFA. On February 13, RSMC La Réunion had declared that a Tropical Disturbance has formed in the area and began issuing advisories. Located in a very favorable environment, the depression quickly gained intensity and both the RSMC and JTWC had noted winds of at least 65 km/h (40 mph) later that day, with the RSMC subsequently naming the storm Dineo.

Dineo struck Mozambique on February 15 as a tropical cyclone, bringing torrential rain and damaging winds. Dineo was the first tropical cyclone to hit Mozambique since Cyclone Jokwe in 2008. Satellite-derived estimates indicated up to 200 mm (7.9 in) of rain fell in Inhambane. At least seven people were killed across the country, including a child crushed by a fallen tree in Massinga. An estimated 20,000 homes were destroyed and approximately 130,000 people were directly affected. Widespread flooding took place in Zimbabwe, with Mutare, Chiredzi, and Beitbridge particularly hard-hit. At least 271 people were killed by the storm and damage exceeded US$200 million. The storm's remnants triggered destructive floods in Botswana. In the month following the storm, a cholera outbreak in Mozambique and Malawi infected more than 1,200 people and claimed 2 lives.

=== Intense Tropical Cyclone Enawo ===
- Intense tropical cyclone (MFR)
- Category 4 tropical cyclone (SSHWS)
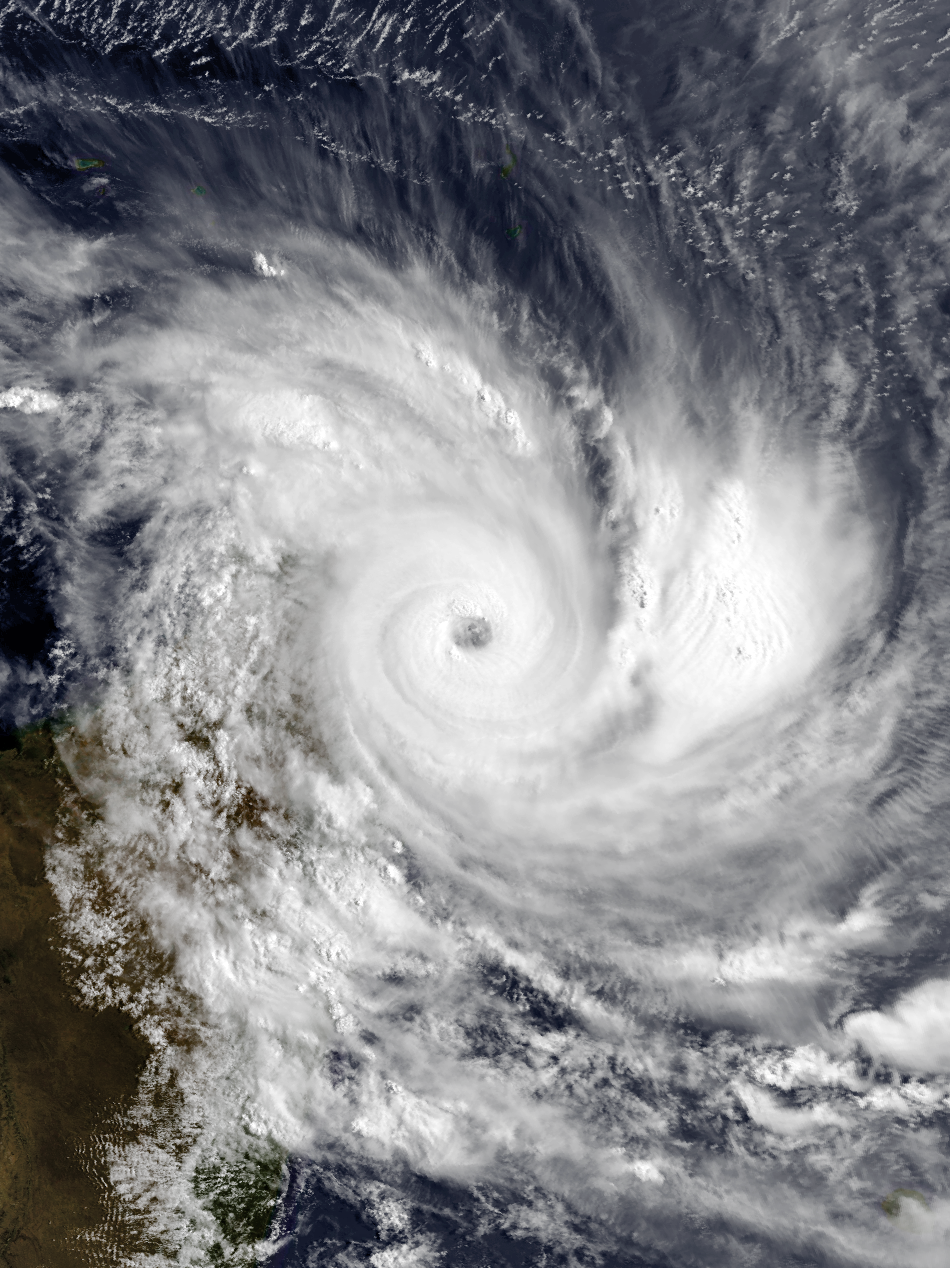
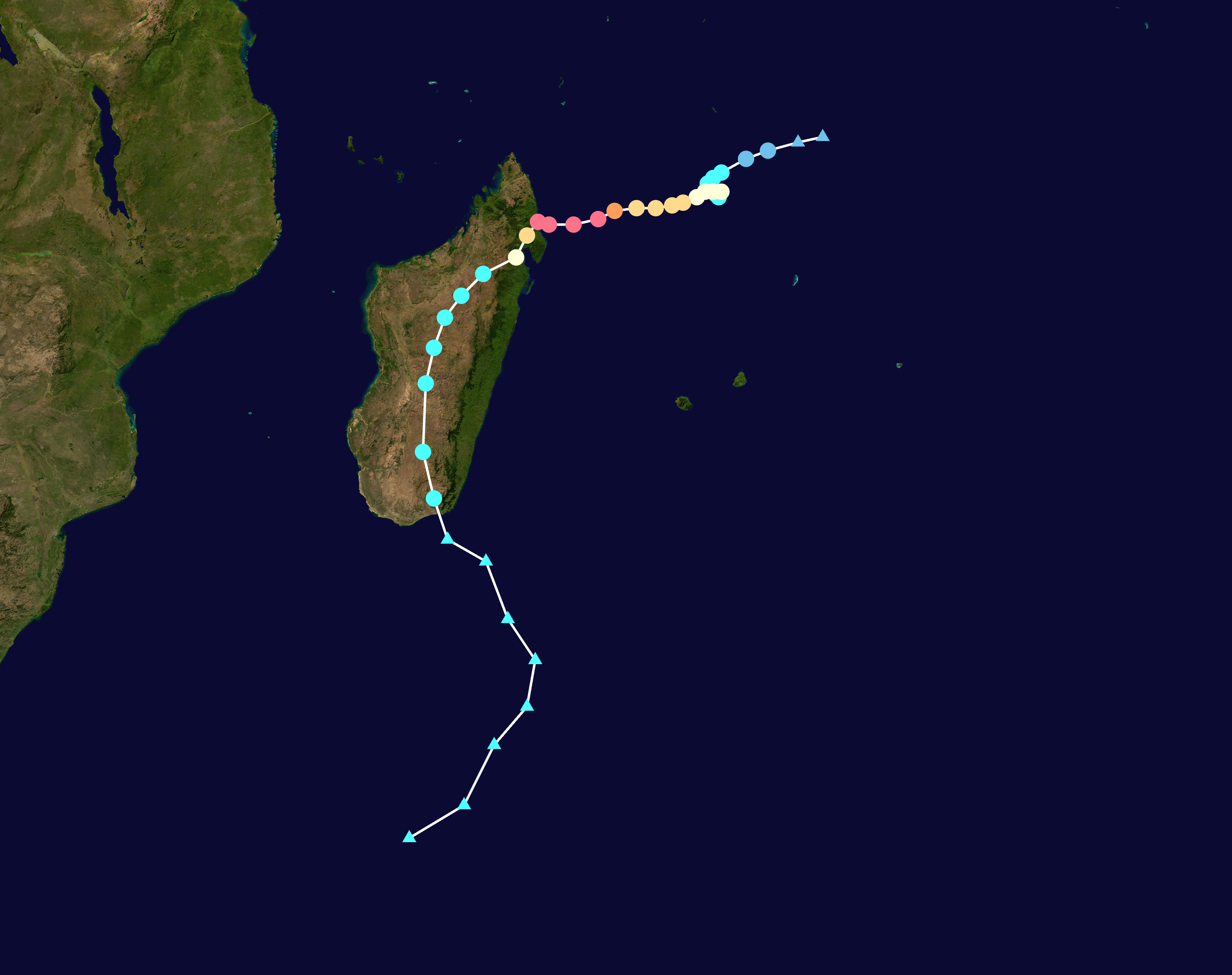
- Duration: March 2 – March 10
- Peak intensity: 205 km/h (125 mph) (10-min); 932 hPa (mbar)

A monsoon trough started to persist west of Diego Garcia in late February 2017 as the Madden–Julian oscillation (MJO) over the Indian Ocean grew more noticeable. On 2 March, a zone of disturbed weather formed within the area, although it was initially difficult to define a clear centre; later, the Joint Typhoon Warning Center (JTWC) issued a Tropical Cyclone Formation Alert for the improving low-level structure and favourable environmental conditions. Only six hours after the system about 820 km (510 mi) north of Mauritius intensifying to a tropical disturbance, Météo-France upgraded it to a moderate tropical storm at 06:00 UTC on 3 March with the name Enawo from the Mauritius Meteorological Services, because of the recent ASCAT-B data suggesting gale-force winds. The JTWC also began to issue tropical cyclone warnings on Enawo.

Enawo developed into a severe tropical storm at around 18:00 UTC on 4 March, for showing an impressive embedded centre pattern associated with extremely cold cloud tops. Enawo formed a ragged eye soon thanks to favourable conditions of excellent outflow, weaker vertical wind shear, and warm sea surface temperatures; however, the strengthening phase was halted for a half of day owing to a possible eyewall replacement cycle. Enawo started to intensify again and developed a well-defined eye indicated by both of satellite and microwave imageries, prompting Météo-France upgrading the system to an intense tropical cyclone at 12:00 UTC based on the structural improvements. Enawo reached its peak intensity at 06:00 UTC on 7 March, with ten-minute maximum sustained winds at 205 km/h (125 mph) and the central pressure at 925 hPa (27.32 inHg). Soon after that, Enawo made landfall over the area between Antalaha and Sambava in Sava Region, Madagascar at around 09:30 UTC (12:30 EAT), becoming the strongest landfall to the country since Gafilo in 2004. The cyclone started to rapidly weaken due to land interaction with a cloud-filled eye and the warming cloud tops; the JTWC also issued a final warning later for the inland movement.

=== Moderate Tropical Storm Fernando ===
- Moderate tropical storm (MFR)
- Tropical storm (SSHWS)
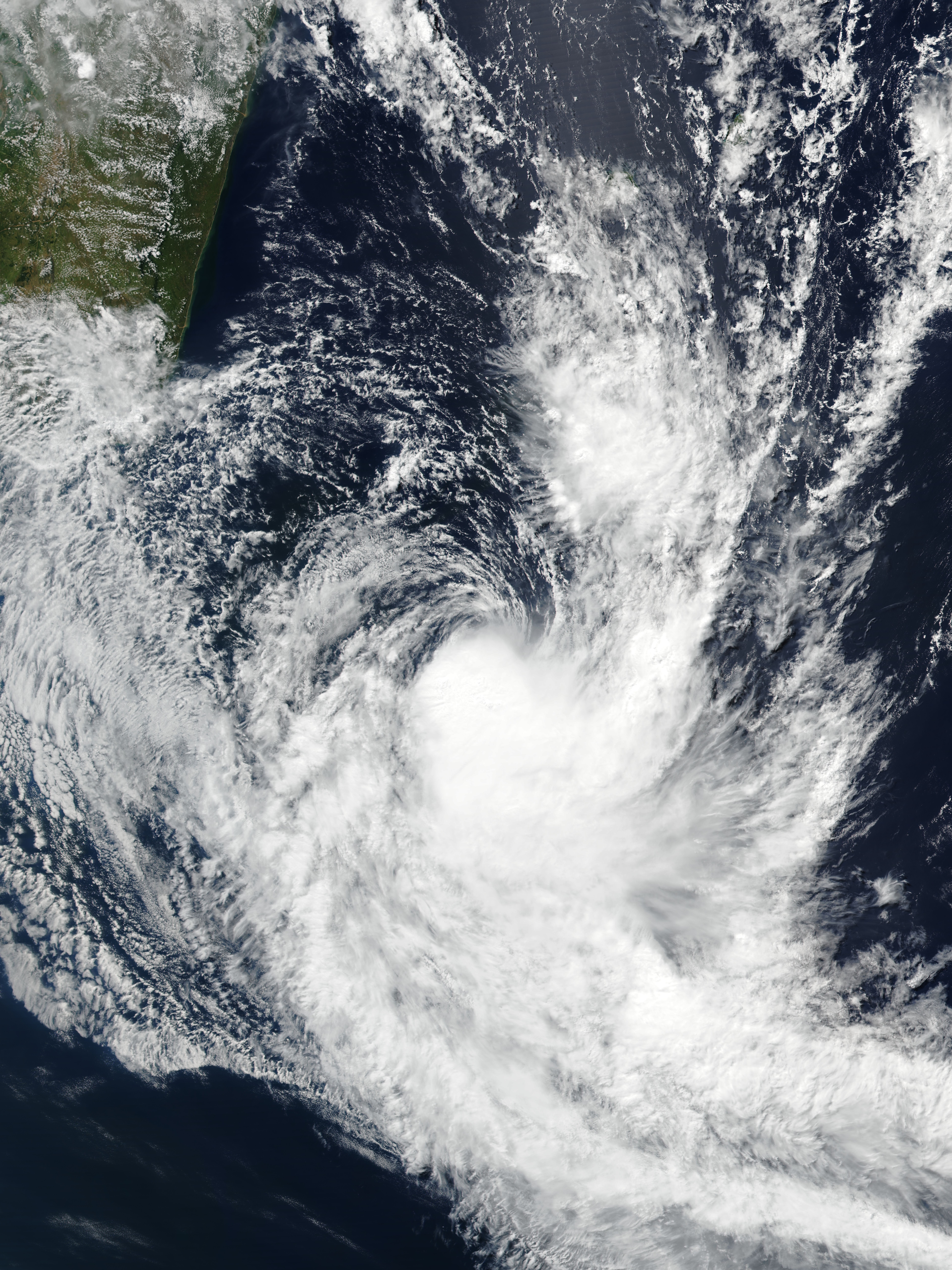
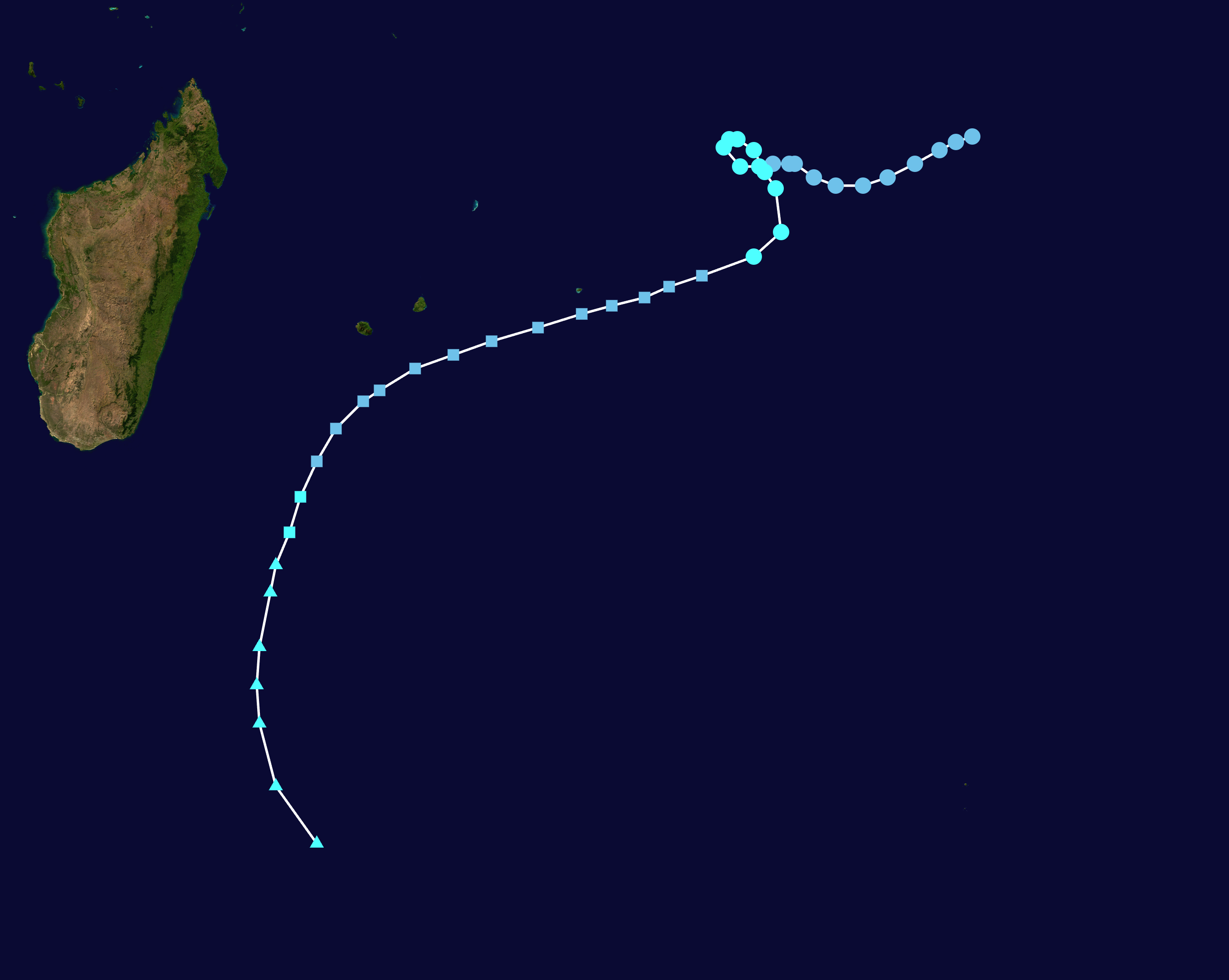
- Duration: March 6 – March 14
- Peak intensity: 70 km/h (45 mph) (10-min); 992 hPa (mbar)

A tropical wave developed far east off the British Indian Ocean Territory on March 3. Drifting slowly towards the southwest over the next couple of days, it gradually organized into a well marked area of low pressure. On March 6, RSMC La Réunion began tracking the system as Tropical Disturbance 7. As the low-level circulation center (LLCC) became more consolidated and bands of convection improved, the JTWC issued a TCFA for the system; and less than three hours later, RSMC La Réunion began tracking it as a tropical depression. It wasn't until late on March 8, however, that the JTWC issued their first warning on the depression. The system was drifting southwestward under the influence of a strong subtropical ridge location just south of it. It was located about 940 kilometres (580 mi) south-sowthwest Diego Garcia when winds of 65 km/h (40 mph) were first noted.

While the JTWC had reported tropical-storm force winds over the next two days, RSMC La Réunion only tracked it as a tropical depression until March 10 when both the agencies reported that the system had dissipated. RSMC had downgraded the depression to a Zone of Disturbed Weather while the JTWC reported that the LLCC was dissipating into a trough. The system continued to track in a generally southwestern direction and exhibited subtropical characteristics. RSMC La Réunion resumed tracking it as a tropical depression on March 14. Later that day, the RSMC had further upgraded the system to a Moderate Tropical Storm and named it Fernando, despite its subtropical nature. RSMC La Réunion first reported the post-tropical nature of Fernando on March 15 at 00:00 UTC while the central pressure continued to drop. They issued their final warning later that day.

=== Other systems ===
During May 30, the Australian Bureau of Meteorology started to monitor Tropical Low 31U, which had developed about 2,000 km (1,245 mi) west of Jakarta, Indonesia. Over the next few days, the system moved southwestwards and was classified as an area of low pressure by RSMC La Réunion, before it started to fill up and dissipated on June 2.

== Storm names ==
Within the South-West Indian Ocean, tropical depressions and subtropical depressions that are judged to have 10-minute sustained windspeeds of 65 km/h (40 mph) by the Regional Specialized Meteorological Center on La Réunion Island, France (RSMC La Réunion) are usually assigned a name. However, it is the Sub-Regional Tropical Cyclone Advisory Centers in Mauritius and Madagascar who name the systems. The Sub-Regional Tropical Cyclone Advisory Center in Mauritius names a storm should it intensify into a moderate tropical storm between 55°E and 90°E. If instead a cyclone intensifies into a moderate tropical storm between 30°E and 55°E then the Sub-Regional Tropical Cyclone Advisory Center in Madagascar assigns the appropriate name to the storm.

Beginning with the 2016–17 season, name lists within the South-West Indian Ocean have been rotated on a triennial basis. Storm names are only used once, thus any storm name used this year would be removed from rotation and replaced with a new name for the 2019–20 season. Names not used in 2016–17 would remain on the list for the 2019–20 season.

- Abela
- Bransby
- Carlos
- Dineo
- Enawo
- Fernando
- Gabekile (unused)
- Herold (unused)
- Irondro (unused)
- Jeruto (unused)
- Kundai (unused)
- Lisebo (unused)
- Michel (unused)
- Nousra (unused)
- Olivier (unused)
- Pokera (unused)
- Quincy (unused)
- Rebaone (unused)
- Salama (unused)
- Tristan (unused)
- Ursula (unused)
- Violet (unused)
- Wilson (unused)
- Xila (unused)
- Yekela (unused)
- Zania (unused)

After the season, the six names used were automatically retired and were replaced with Ambali, Belna, Calvinia, Diane, Esami and Francisco, respectively for the 2019–20 season.

== Seasonal effects ==
This table lists all of the tropical cyclones and subtropical cyclones that were monitored during the 2016–2017 South-West Indian Ocean cyclone season. Information on their intensity, duration, name, areas affected, primarily comes from RSMC La Réunion. Death and damage reports come from either press reports or the relevant national disaster management agency while the damage totals are given in 2016 or 2017 USD.

Name	Dates	Peak intensity			Areas affected	Damage (USD)	Deaths	Ref(s).
Name	Dates	Category	Wind speed	Pressure	Areas affected	Damage (USD)	Deaths	Ref(s).
Abela	July 15–19	Severe tropical storm	95 km/h (60 mph)	987 hPa (29.15 inHg)	Madagascar	None	None	
Bransby	October 3–6	Subtropical depression	100 km/h (65 mph)	987 hPa (29.15 inHg)	None	None	None	
03	January 27–28	Tropical depression	55 km/h (35 mph)	1,005 hPa (29.68 inHg)	None	None	None	
Carlos	February 3–10	Tropical cyclone	130 km/h (80 mph)	965 hPa (28.50 inHg)	Réunion, Mauritius	None	None	
Dineo	February 13–17	Tropical cyclone	140 km/h (85 mph)	955 hPa (28.20 inHg)	Mozambique, South Africa, Zimbabwe, Botswana, Malawi	$217 million	280	
Enawo	March 2–10	Intense tropical cyclone	205 km/h (125 mph)	932 hPa (27.52 inHg)	Madagascar, Réunion	$400 million	78	
Fernando	March 6–14	Moderate tropical storm	70 km/h (45 mph)	992 hPa (29.29 inHg)	Rodrigues	None	None	
Season aggregates
7 systems	July 15, 2016 – March 14, 2017		205 km/h (125 mph)	932 hPa (27.52 inHg)		$617 million	356	

== See also ==
- Weather of 2016 and 2017
- Tropical cyclones in 2016 and 2017
- List of Southern Hemisphere tropical cyclone seasons
- Atlantic hurricane seasons: 2016, 2017
- Pacific hurricane seasons: 2016, 2017
- Pacific typhoon seasons: 2016, 2017
- North Indian Ocean cyclone seasons: 2016, 2017
- 2016–17 Australian region cyclone season
- 2016–17 South Pacific cyclone season
- South Atlantic tropical cyclone
