= Cyclone Dineo =

South-West Indian Ocean tropical cyclone in 2017

Tropical Cyclone Dineo
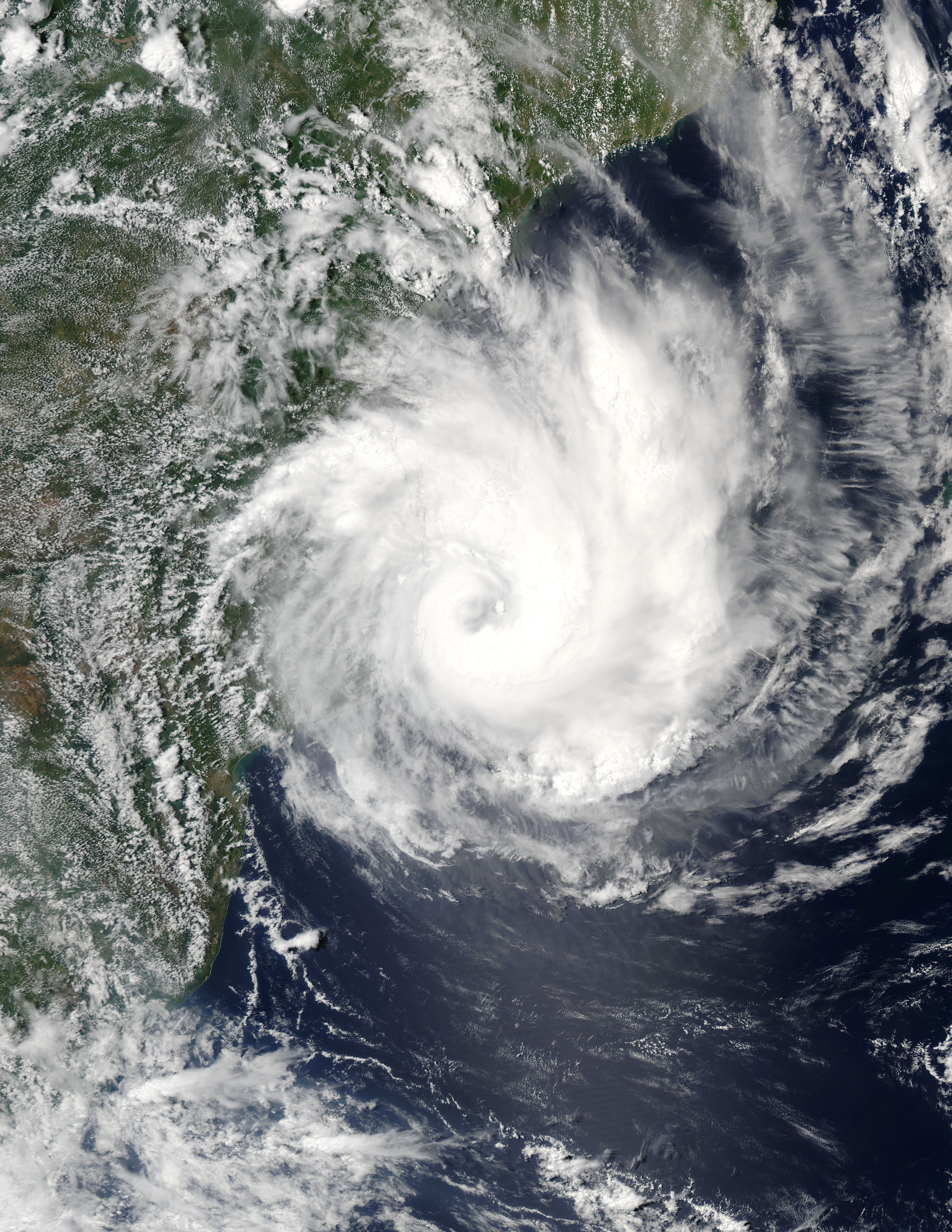
- Cyclone Dineo at peak intensity hours before making landfall on Mozambique

Meteorological history
- Formed: 12 February 2017
- Dissipated: 17 February 2017

Tropical cyclone
- 10-minute sustained (MFR)
- Highest winds: 140 km/h (85 mph)
- Highest gusts: 195 km/h (120 mph)
- Lowest pressure: 955 hPa (mbar); 28.20 inHg

Category 2-equivalent tropical cyclone
- 1-minute sustained (SSHWS/JTWC)
- Highest winds: 155 km/h (100 mph)
- Lowest pressure: 959 hPa (mbar); 28.32 inHg

Overall effects
- Fatalities: 280
- Damage: $217 million (2017 USD)
- Areas affected: Mozambique, Zimbabwe, Malawi, Botswana, South Africa
- IBTrACS /
- Part of the 2016–17 South-West Indian Ocean cyclone season

Tropical Cyclone Dineo was one of the deadliest tropical cyclones on record in the South-West Indian Ocean and Southern Hemisphere as a whole. It was the first tropical cyclone to hit Mozambique since Cyclone Jokwe in 2008.

== Meteorological history ==
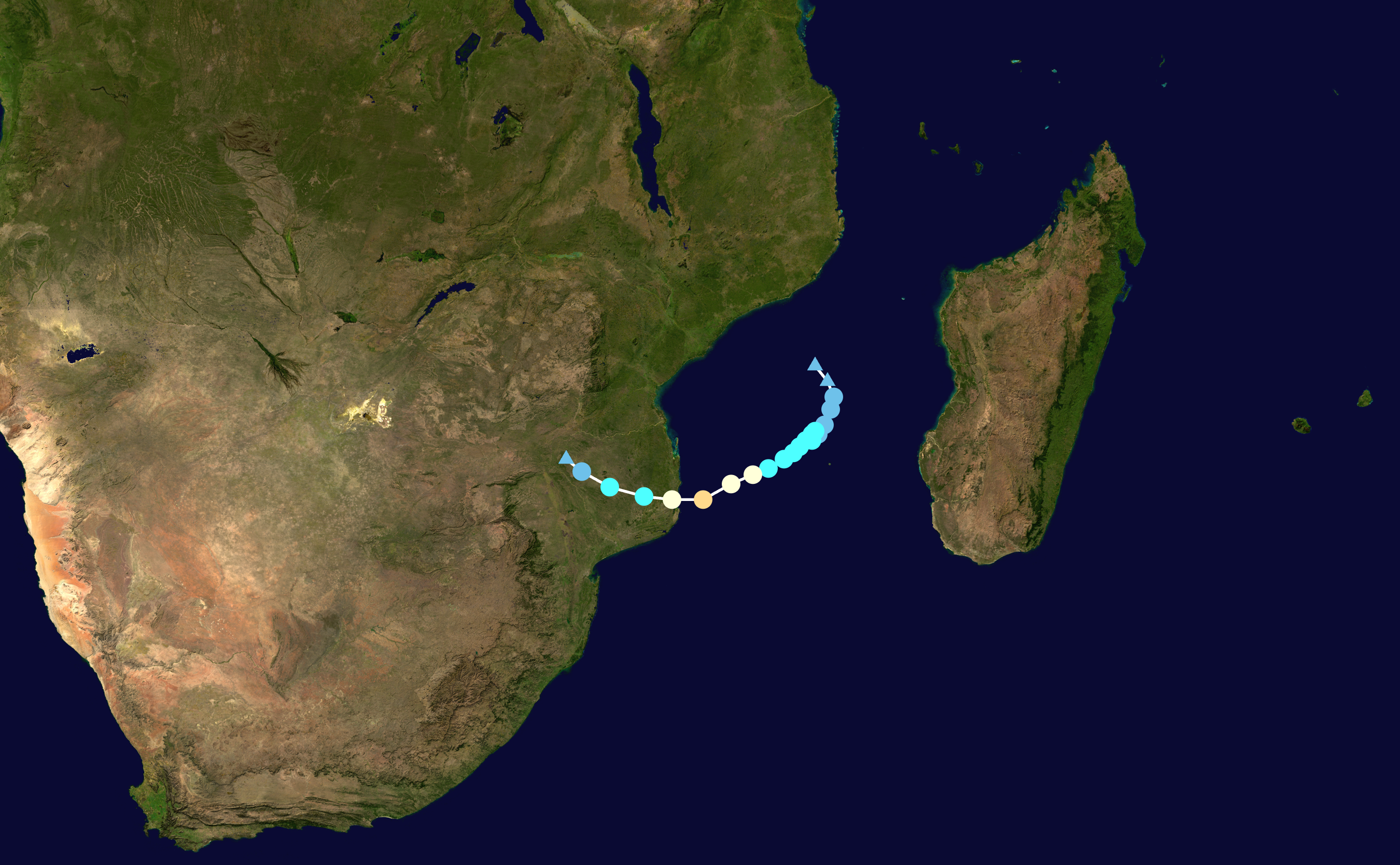
Map plotting the storm's track and intensity, according to the Saffir–Simpson scale Map key Saffir–Simpson scale Tropical depression (≤38 mph, ≤62 km/h) Tropical storm (39–73 mph, 63–118 km/h) Category 1 (74–95 mph, 119–153 km/h) Category 2 (96–110 mph, 154–177 km/h) Category 3 (111–129 mph, 178–208 km/h) Category 4 (130–156 mph, 209–251 km/h) Category 5 (≥157 mph, ≥252 km/h) Unknown Storm type Tropical cyclone Subtropical cyclone Extratropical cyclone, remnant low, tropical disturbance, or monsoon depression

The origins of Dineo can be tracked back to a cluster of thunderstorms that organized into an area of low pressure in the Mozambique Channel on 11 February. Over the next two days, the system gradually drifted in a generally southern track as it gained intensity and prompted the JTWC to issue a TCFA. On 13 February, RSMC La Réunion declared that a Tropical Disturbance had formed in the area and began issuing advisories. Located in a very favorable environment, the depression quickly increased in intensity and both the RSMC and JTWC noted winds of at least 65 km/h (40 mph) later that day, with the RSMC subsequently naming the storm Dineo. Dineo intensified to a tropical cyclone later on. It reached its peak intensity with maximum sustained winds of 85 mph (140 km/h) and a low barometric pressure of 955 hPa (mbar); 28.20 inHg on 15 February. Dineo made landfall on the coast of Mozambique, and it started weakening after landfall on the same day. On 17 February after making landfall, the JTWC issued the final advisory on Dineo. Dineo later dissipated after a few hours on the same day.

== Impact ==
Dineo struck Mozambique on 15 February as a tropical cyclone, bringing torrential rain and damaging winds. Dineo was the first tropical cyclone to hit Mozambique since Cyclone Jokwe in 2008. Satellite-derived estimates indicated up to 200 mm (7.9 in) of rain fell in Inhambane. At least seven people were killed across the country, including a child crushed by a fallen tree in Massinga. An estimated 20,000 homes were destroyed and approximately 130,000 people were directly affected. Widespread flooding took place in Zimbabwe, with Mutare, Chiredzi, and Beitbridge particularly hard-hit. At least 271 people were killed by the storm and damage exceeded US$200 million. The storm's remnants triggered destructive floods in Botswana. In the month following the storm, a cholera outbreak in Mozambique and Malawi infected more than 1,200 people and claimed 2 lives.

== See also ==
- Weather of 2017
- Tropical cyclones in 2017
- Cyclone Jokwe (2008) – The most recent tropical cyclone to hit Mozambique prior to Dineo
- Cyclone Idai (2019) – A similar, but stronger and deadlier tropical cyclone which affected similar areas
