= Abila =

Abila, also spelled Abyla, may refer to:

== Places ==
- Abila in the Decapolis, ancient city in the Levant
- Abila Lysaniou, capital of ancient Abilene, northwest of present-day Damascus, Syria
- Abila (Peraea), archaeological site in Jordan
- Abila, Latin name of Ávila, Spain
- Abyla, Roman colony in the province of Mauretania Tingitana
- Mount Abila, mountain in Ceuta, autonomous city of Spain, in Africa

== Other ==
- Abila (grasshopper), a genus of grasshoppers

== See also ==
- Abela, a surname
- Abilene (biblical)
