= Abellu =

Abellu ابللو
- Village
- Location within Iran
- Coordinates: 38°35′56″N 46°54′23″E
- Country: Iran
- Province: East Azerbaijan
- County: Ahar
- Bakhsh: Central
- Rural District: Azghan

Population (2006)
  - Total: 207
- Time zone: UTC+3:30 (IRST)
  - Summer (DST): UTC+4:30 (IRDT)

Abellu (Azerbaijani and Persian: ابللو, also Romanized as Abellū and Ablalū; also known as Abella, Ābla, and Ablū) is a village in Azghan Rural District, in the Central District of Ahar County, East Azerbaijan Province, Iran. At the 2006 census, its population was 207, in 45 families.
