= Alicia Abella =

American engineer

- Education: New York University, Columbia University
- Engineering career
- Discipline: Cloud Services
- Institutions: Bell Labs, Google
- Projects: President's Advisory Commission on Educational Excellence for Hispanics
- Awards: WITI Hall of Fame

Alicia Abella is an American engineer. She served on the President's Advisory Commission on Educational Excellence for Hispanics, and has received Columbia University Medal of Excellence. In 2011, she was inducted into the WITI Hall of Fame.

== Biography ==
She received a bachelor's degree from New York University and an MS, MPhil, and PhD in computer science from Columbia University Engineering. She married Aleksandar Timcenko, a quantitative finance professional who would go on to hold roles at DE Shaw and Goldman Sachs.

Immediately following graduation, she was employed by Bell Labs, where she would reach Executive Director of the Innovative Services Research Department, and later manage the Cloud Services research platform. Her research portfolio also includes studies on generating semantically consistent inputs for dialogue managers, aiming to improve the coherence and effectiveness of machine responses in conversational systems. In 2010, Hispanic Business magazine named Abella one of the top five women of the year, a testament to her exceptional contributions in the fields of technology and community service. In 2013, she was awarded the Columbia University Medal of Excellence. In 2011, she was appointed to the President's Advisory Commission on Educational Excellence for Hispanics. She was inducted into the WITI Hall of Fame by Barack Obama for being a strong advocate for diversity in STEM fields. She has actively mentored youth and served on the President's Advisory Commission on Educational Excellence for Hispanics, reflecting her commitment to educational outreach and mentorship. She has received awards from the Women of Color STEM Conference. Abella also was awarded the Leadership of the Year Award by the Latinos in Information Sciences and Technology Association.

In 2020, she joined Google as a Managing Director for Telecom, Media & Entertainment Industry Solutions, where she continues to drive technological innovation and transformation in the industry.
