= George S. Abela =

Lebanese scientist

Dr. George S. Abela is a clinician scientist, Professor of Medicine and Chief of the Cardiology Division at Michigan State University College of Human Medicine.

== Education ==
Abela has a master's degree in cardiovascular pharmacology, an M.D. from the American University of Beirut in Lebanon and an MBA from Michigan State University. He completed his residency and internship in medicine at Emory University and his fellowship in cardiology at the University of Florida. He then worked as an associate professor of medicine at Harvard Medical School, and was a director of Interventional Research and Cardiovascular Photobiology Laboratory at Deaconess Hospital as well as co-director of the Institute for Prevention of Cardiovascular Disease at Harvard Medical School. During his tenure at Michigan State University, he served in different positions including Laboratory Director, Chief of the Division of Cardiology, Professor of Medicine, and Program Director for Cardiovascular Fellowship training program.

== Research & career ==
His research interests include atherosclerosis, platelet aggregation, vascular injury, plaque rupture, imaging atherosclerotic plaque, and thrombosis. Abela's laboratory studies the role of cholesterol crystals in plaque rupture and thrombosis leading to heart attacks and strokes. This led to the discovery that when cholesterol changes from a liquid to a solid crystal phase its greater volume leads to arterial wall tears; by avoiding alcohol use in tissue processing for microscopy, the role of cholesterol crystal injury became evident. He also conducted research on laser systems for the treatment of cardiovascular disease and on the rare and serious unforeseen complication of lesions during balloon angioplasty (CBA).

== Awards ==
Abela was the recipient of the 1998 Caroline and William Mark Memorial Award by the American Society for Laser Medicine and Surgery.

Additional awards include the Ellet Drake Lectureship Award, Mark B. Award, Distinguished Research Mentor Award and Outstanding Clinician Award. He is a fellow of American College of Cardiology, American Heart Association, Royal Society of Medicine.

== Bibliography ==
- George S. Abela. Proceedings of Diagnostic and Therapeutic Cardiovascular Interventions II. Society of Photo-Optical Instrumentation Engineers.
- George S. Abela. "Peripheral Vascular Disease: Basic Diagnostic and Therapeutic Approaches". Amazon.
- George S. Abela. “Lasers in Cardiovascular Medicine and Surgery: Fundamentals and Techniques”. Martinus Nijhoff, (Kluwer), Boston. 1990.
- George S. Abela. "Diagnostic and Therapeutic Cardiovascular Interventions IV". Society of Photo-Optical Publishers.
- George S. Abela. "Myocardial Revascularization: Novel Percutaneous Approaches". Wiley Liss Publishers.
- Kusai Aziz, and George S. Abela. "Diagnostic Imaging of Coronary Artery Disease". Lippincott Williams and Wilkins publishers.

== Patents ==
Some of his patents include:

- Laser treatment apparatus and method, (1991).
- Angioscopic system and method for dimensional measurement including measurement of the distance from angioscopic ends to designated planes, (1991).
- Cardiac ablation catheters and method, (1996).
- Optical fiber catheter and method, (1997).
- Mapping catheter and method, (1997)
- Cardiac catheter anchoring, (1998).

== Publications ==
- George S. Abela, Monika Leja, Abed Janoudi, Daniel Perry, James Richard, Heather De Feijter-Rupp, Abby Vanderberg and Ilce Medina Meza. "Relationship between Atherosclerosis and Certain Solid Cancer Tumors". Journal of the American College of Cardiology.
- George S. Abela, Jagadeesh K. Kalavakunta, Abed Janoudi, Dale Leffler, Gaurav Dhar, Negar Salehi, Joel Cohn, Ibrahim Shah, Milind Karve, Veera Pavan K. Kotaru, Vishal Gupta, Shukri David, Keerthy K. Narisetty, Michael Rich, Abigail Vanderberg, Dorothy R. Pathak, and Fadi E. Shamoun. "Frequency of Cholesterol Crystals in Culprit Coronary Artery Aspirate During Acute Myocardial Infarction and Their Relation to Inflammation and Myocardial Injury". The American Journal of Cardiology.
- George S. Abela, Kusai Aziz, Ameeth Vedre, Dorothy Pathak, John D. Talbott, Joyce DeJong. Effect of Cholesterol Crystals on Plaques and Intima in Arteries of Patients with Acute Coronary and Cerebrovascular Syndromes. American Journal of Cardiology. 103:959–968, 2009.
- George S. Abela, Fadi Shamoun, Ameeth Vedre, Dorothy R. Pathak, Ibrahim Shah, Gaurav Dhar, and Dale Leffler. "The Effect of Ethanol on Cholesterol Crystals During Tissue Preparation for Scanning Electron Microscopy". Journal of the American College of Cardiology.
- George S. Abela, Ameeth Vedre, Abed Janoudi, Ruiping Huang, Sridevi Durga, and Umesh Tamhane. "Effect of Statins on Cholesterol Crystallization and Atherosclerotic Plaque Stabilization". The American Journal of Cardiology.
- George S. Abela, Kusai Aziz. Cholesterol Crystals Rupture Biological Membranes and Human Plaques During Acute Cardiovascular Events: A Novel Insight into Plaque Rupture by Scanning Electron Microscopy. Scanning. 28:1-10, 2006
