= Pebane =

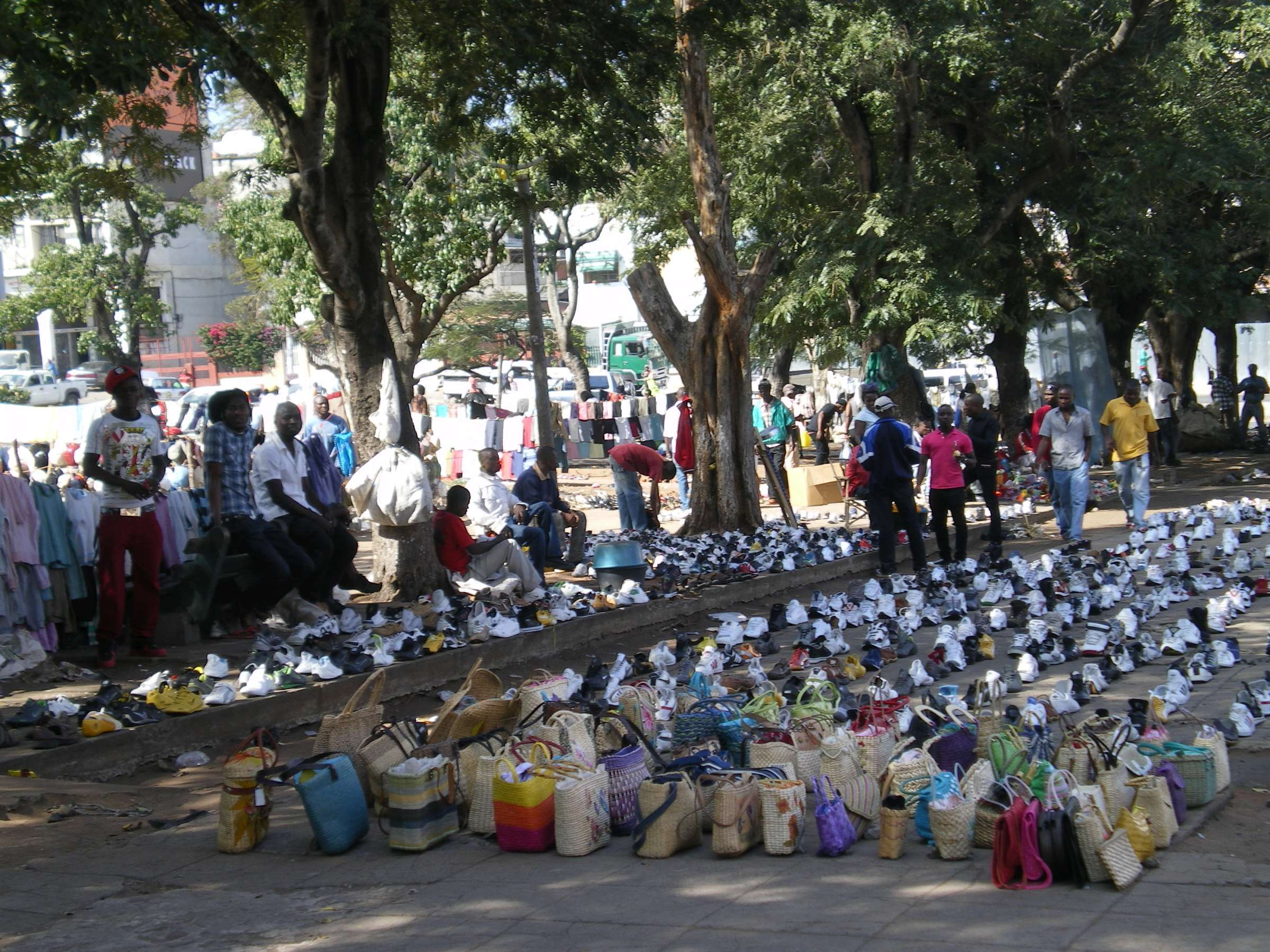
- Pebane

- Location within Mozambique
- Coordinates: 17°16′00″S 38°10′00″E
- Country: Mozambique
- Provinces: Zambezia Province
- District: Pebane District

Area
  - Total: 10,182 km^{2} (3,931 sq mi)
- Elevation: 1 m (3.3 ft)

Population (2005)
  - Total: 58,342
  - Density: 5.7299/km^{2} (14.840/sq mi)
- Climate: Aw

Pebane is a town and transshipment port in Mozambique in the Zambezia Province. The port is in the estuary of the Rio Moniga.

Pebane is a transhipment port for copra. Approximately 3,000t of copra is exported annually.

== Sports ==
- Sporting Clube de Pebane
