= Cyclone Jokwe =

South-West Indian cyclone in 2008

Intense Tropical Cyclone Jokwe
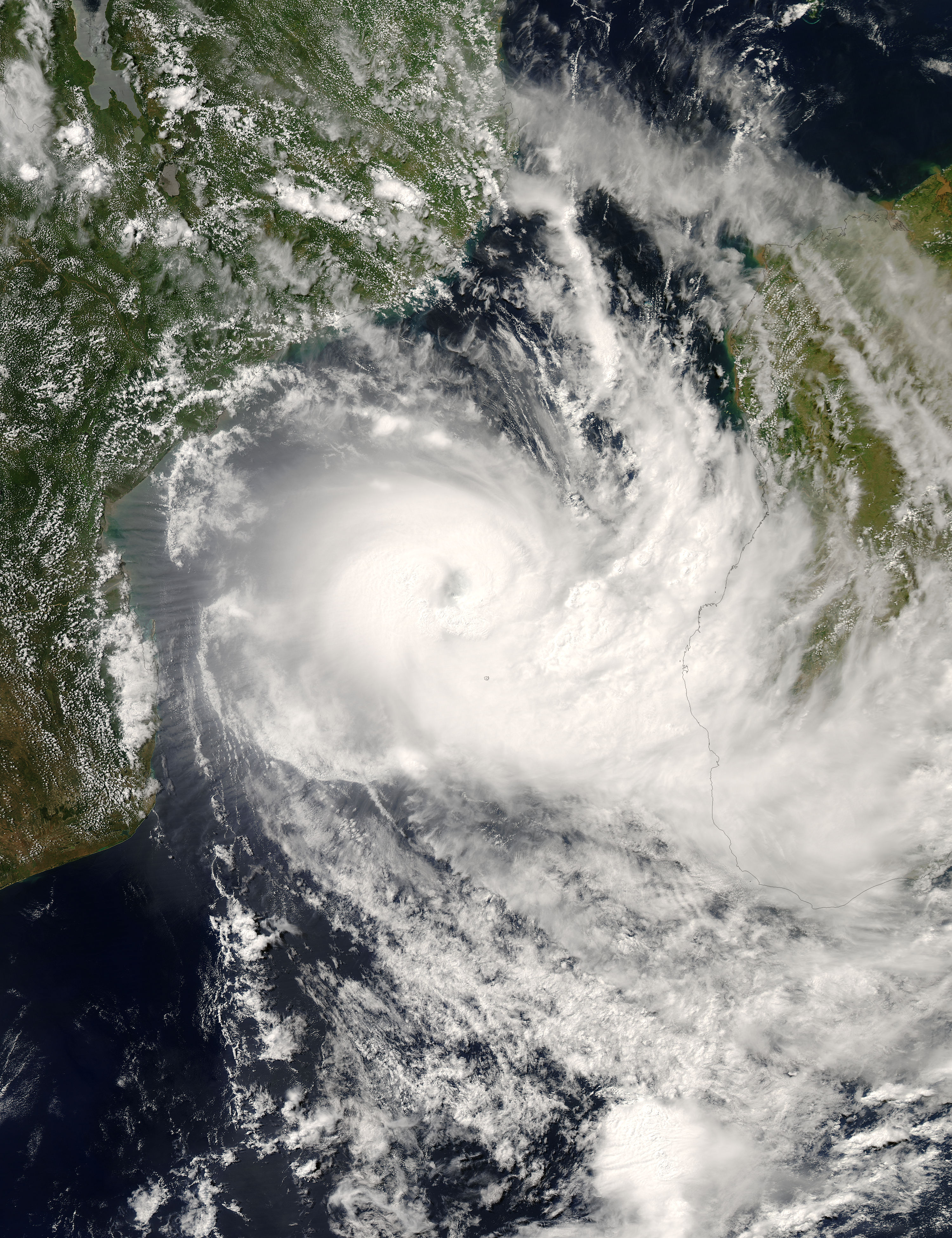
- Intense Tropical Cyclone Cyclone Jokwe on 10 March

Meteorological history
- Formed: 2 March 2008
- Dissipated: 16 March 2008

Intense tropical cyclone
- 10-minute sustained (MFR)
- Highest winds: 195 km/h (120 mph)
- Highest gusts: 270 km/h (165 mph)
- Lowest pressure: 940 hPa (mbar); 27.76 inHg

Category 3-equivalent tropical cyclone
- 1-minute sustained (SSHWS/JTWC)
- Highest winds: 205 km/h (125 mph)
- Lowest pressure: 941 hPa (mbar); 27.79 inHg

Overall effects
- Fatalities: 16 direct
- Damage: >$8 million (2008 USD)
- Areas affected: Madagascar, Mozambique
- IBTrACS
- Part of the 2007–08 South-West Indian Ocean cyclone season

Intense Tropical Cyclone Jokwe was the first tropical cyclone to make landfall in Mozambique since Cyclone Favio struck in the previous year, and was the most recent cyclone to make landfall on Mozambique until Cyclone Dineo in 2017. The tenth named storm of the 2007–08 South-West Indian Ocean cyclone season, Jokwe was first classified as a tropical depression on 2 March over the open Southwest Indian Ocean. It tracked west-southwest, crossing northern Madagascar as a tropical storm on 5 March before intensifying into a tropical cyclone on 6 March. Jokwe rapidly intensified to reach peak winds of 195 km/h (121 mph), before weakening slightly and striking Nampula Province in northeastern Mozambique. It quickly weakened while paralleling the coastline, though the storm restrengthened as it turned southward in the Mozambique Channel. Late in its duration, it remained nearly stationary for several days, and steadily weakened due to wind shear before dissipating on 16 March.

The storm caused minor damage in northern Madagascar. In Mozambique, the cyclone affected 200,000 people, and left at least sixteen fatalities. Cyclone Jokwe destroyed over 9,000 houses and damaged over 3,000 more, with the heaviest damage in Angoche and the Island of Mozambique in Nampula Province. The storm also caused widespread power outages and crop damages. The name Jokwe was submitted to the World Meteorological Organization by Botswana.

== Meteorological history ==
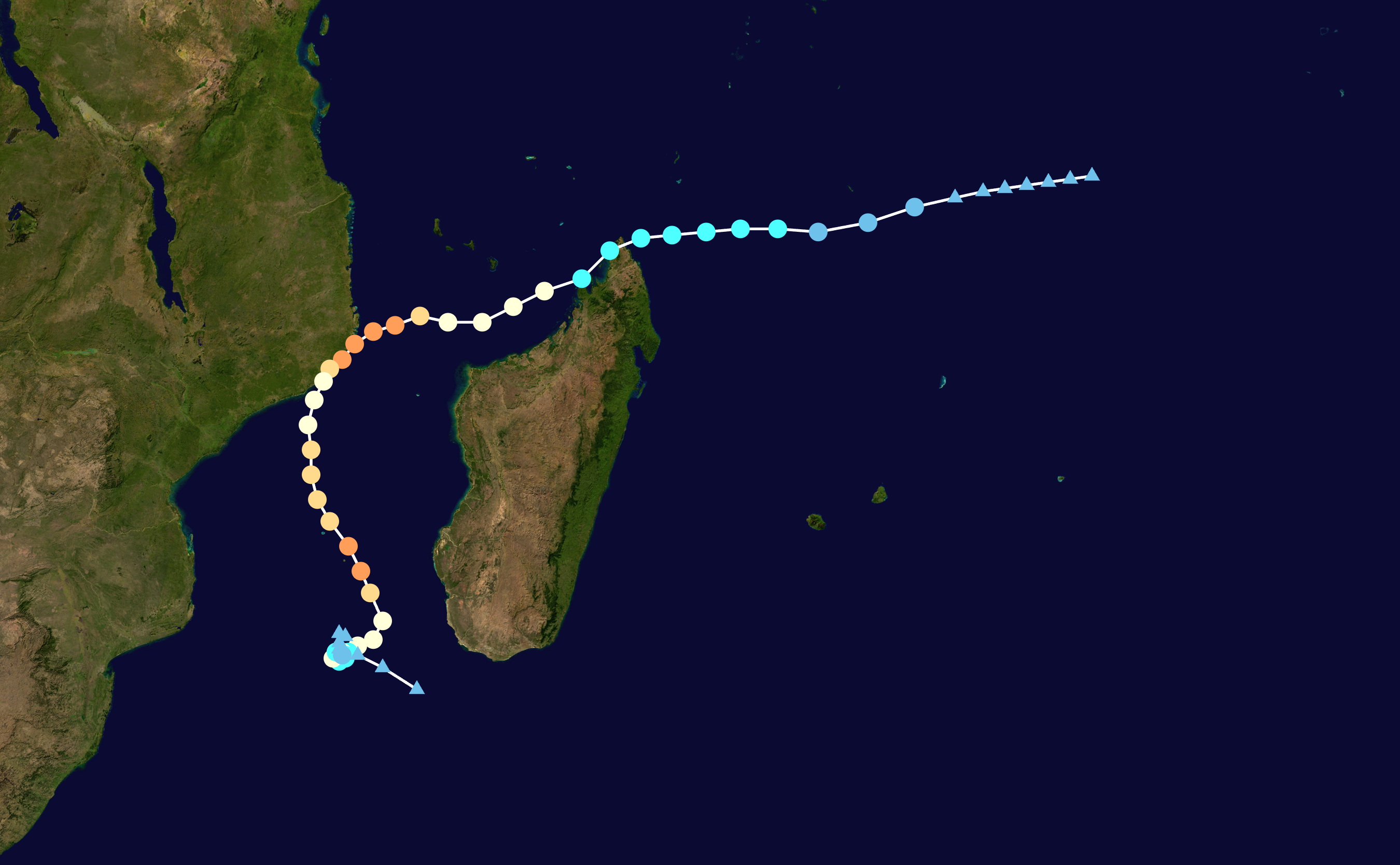
Map plotting the storm's track and intensity, according to the Saffir–Simpson scale Map key Saffir–Simpson scale Tropical depression (≤38 mph, ≤62 km/h) Tropical storm (39–73 mph, 63–118 km/h) Category 1 (74–95 mph, 119–153 km/h) Category 2 (96–110 mph, 154–177 km/h) Category 3 (111–129 mph, 178–208 km/h) Category 4 (130–156 mph, 209–251 km/h) Category 5 (≥157 mph, ≥252 km/h) Unknown Storm type Tropical cyclone Subtropical cyclone Extratropical cyclone, remnant low, tropical disturbance, or monsoon depression

In the beginning of the month, an area of convection persisted in association with a broad low-level circulation about 565 km (351 mi) west-southwest of Diego Garcia. The disturbance tracked west-southwestward, and on 2 March the Météo-France (MFR) declared it as a weak depression. Initially in an area of moderate wind shear, the system at first failed to maintain deep convection. Early on 4 March, convection increased and organized around the center of circulation, and the MFR classified it as Tropical Depression Twelve, about 270 km (170 mi) southwest of the Agaléga Islands. Initially the MFR forecast that the depression would intensify further before striking Madagascar.

The cyclone tracked generally westward along the northern periphery of a ridge. The circulation became better defined, though convection was displaced to the west of the center due to persistent wind shear. Intensification was favored, though, due to warm water temperatures and good outflow. Early on 5 March, the Joint Typhoon Warning Center (JTWC) classified the system as Tropical Cyclone 22S. Shortly thereafter, the MFR upgraded the depression to Moderate Tropical Storm Jokwe about 675 km (419 mi) southwest of the Agalega Islands, or about 230 km (140 mi) northeast of the northern tip of Madagascar. At first, the storm was smaller than usual, with gale-force winds extending 37 km (23 mi) from the center. Jokwe turned to the west-southwest in response to the development of a trough of low pressure in the Mozambique Channel, and late on 5 March the storm crossed over northern Madagascar. The low-level circulation became disorganized due to land interaction, though its mid and upper-level circulation remained well-organized. Subsequently, the storm encountered more favorable conditions, and an eye developed; Jokwe underwent rapid deepening and intensified to tropical cyclone status, or the equivalence of a minimal hurricane, midday on 6 March off the northwest coast of Madagascar.

Shortly after attaining tropical cyclone status, Jokwe began weakening as its eye disappeared, and it weakened back to a severe tropical storm. The weakening trend was short-lived, and after turning westward the storm re-developed a 13 km (8.1 mi) eye. Jokwe again underwent rapid intensification as it approached the coast of Mozambique, becoming an intense "midget cyclone" with winds of 175 km/h (109 mph) late on 7 March; the MFR explained its rapid intensity changes due to its small size. Excellent upper-level outflow and warm waters contributed to the intensification. At 0000 UTC on 8 March, Jokwe attained peak winds of 195 km/h (121 mph) about 75 km (47 mi) east of the Island of Mozambique in Nampula Province; at the same time, its gusts reached about 275 km/h (171 mph). It weakened slightly while paralleling the coastline just offshore, and at 1015 UTC Jokwe made landfall between the Island of Mozambique and Angoche.

Cyclone Jokwe remained over land for about 18 hours before emerging into the Mozambique Channel, weakening quickly to tropical storm status. Upon reaching open waters, convection increased over the center, and late on 9 March Jokwe re-intensified to a tropical cyclone as an eye reappeared on satellite imagery. The cyclone turned to the south-southeast, around the periphery of a ridge to its east. An upper-level low to its south produced good outflow which, in combination with warm waters, allowed Jokwe to re-intensify. Late on 10 March, the storm passed about 35 km (22 mi) east of Europa Island, and shortly thereafter the MFR upgraded Jokwe to intense tropical cyclone status with winds of 170 km/h (110 mph). Subsequently, an increase in wind shear caused a steady weakening trend, and by 12 March Jokwe weakened to tropical storm status as its center became partially exposed from the deep convection; at the same time, the storm turned to the southwest.

Later on 12 March, thunderstorms reformed over the center, as its movement became nearly stationary due to a ridge to its south and northwest. Early on 13 March, it began a steady movement to the northwest, and its organization increased with an eye re-appearing; after briefly re-attaining tropical cyclone status, Jokwe again weakened to tropical storm status due to persistent wind shear. Convection continued to diminish, and on 14 March Jokwe weakened to tropical depression status as the center became almost fully exposed. Early the following day, the MFR issued its last advisory on the system. The remnants accelerated southeastward and dissipated on 16 March to the southwest of Madagascar.

== Impact ==
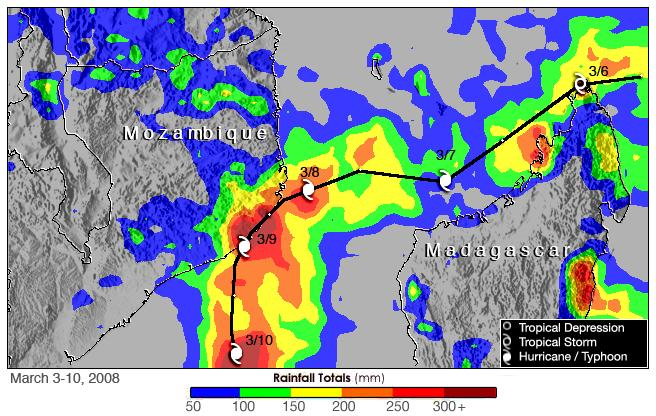
Satellite-derived rainfall estimates for Cyclone Jokwe

=== Madagascar ===
Crossing northern Madagascar as a tropical storm, Jokwe damaged or destroyed 44 buildings in Nosy Be, leaving 400 homeless. Satellite-based rainfall estimates reached over 200 mm (7.9 in) in northwestern Madagascar.

=== Mozambique ===
On 7 March, the National Emergency Operational Centre of Mozambique warned for coastal residents in Nampula and Zambezia provinces to be on alert. A day later, the agency issued a Red Alert for northern Nampula Province, advising potentially affected residents to seek shelter. Subsequently, the alert was extended southwestward along the coastline. Strong winds and heavy rains from the storm left the island of Mozambique without power, as well as water. There winds knocked down several poorly constructed houses, and also destroyed the roofs of two schools. Satellite-based rainfall estimates reached over 300 mm (12 in) in northwestern Madagascar. Across Nampula Province, heavy agricultural damage was reported; a total of 508 animals on farms were killed, and about 2 million cashew trees were destroyed. Widespread power outages were reported, with 75% of power transmission lines damaged or destroyed. The cyclone destroyed at least 200 boats and the roofs of at least 80 schools. The storm destroyed a bridge across the Mogincual River, which left the town of Namige isolated. Across Nampula Province, Jokwe destroyed 9,316 houses and damaged 3,220 more, most of which in Angoche. In Pebane District in neighboring Zambezia Province, the cyclone destroyed nine houses. Rainfall was reported throughout the province, though damage was not as heavy due to lack of strong winds. Throughout Mozambique, the cyclone affected 200,000 people, with a total of 55,000 people left homeless. Ten people were killed in Nampula Province, and six more were killed in coastal districts of Zambezia Province.

=== Elsewhere ===
On 10 March, a station on Europa Island in the Mozambique Channel reported a pressure of 985.5 mbar.

== Aftermath ==
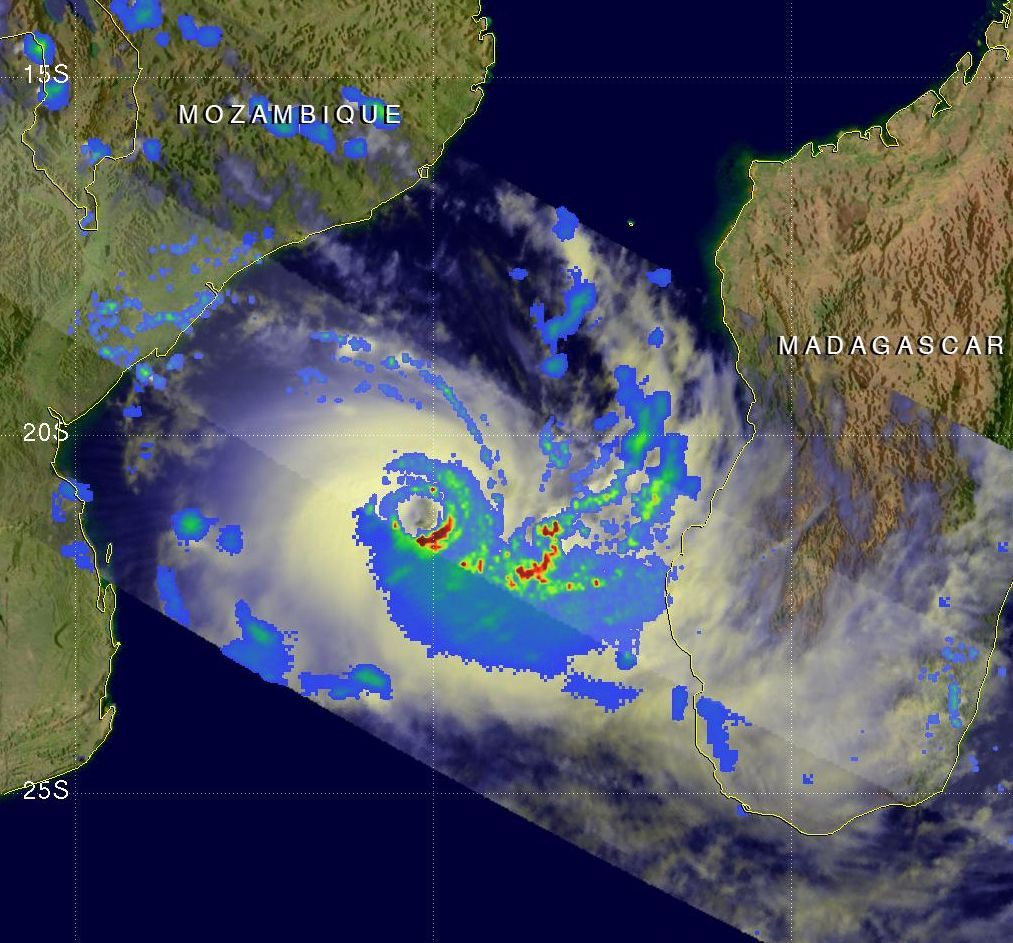
TRMM image of Jokwe on 10 March

Shortly after the cyclone moved ashore along Mozambique, officials distributed tents and food to the affected citizens. The government activated the National Civil Protection Unit to clear fallen trees from roadways, as well as assist in rebuilding damaged or destroyed homes. A few days after the storm, the Mozambique Red Cross began delivering mosquito nets, blankets, plastic buckets, and sleeping mats. The government of Nampula estimated it would require $8 million (USD) to repair storm damage in the province.

Two weeks after the storm, the World Food Programme announced it would provide food for 60,000 people in the impacted areas of Mozambique. On 27 March, the government of Portugal donated $700,000 (USD) to the Mozambique National Disasters Management Institute; over half of the total was aid for flood victims affected by Jokwe and flooding earlier in the year.

== See also ==
- Tropical cyclones in 2008
- Timeline of the 2007–08 South-West Indian Ocean cyclone season
