= 2025–26 South-West Indian Ocean cyclone season =

Tropical cyclone season

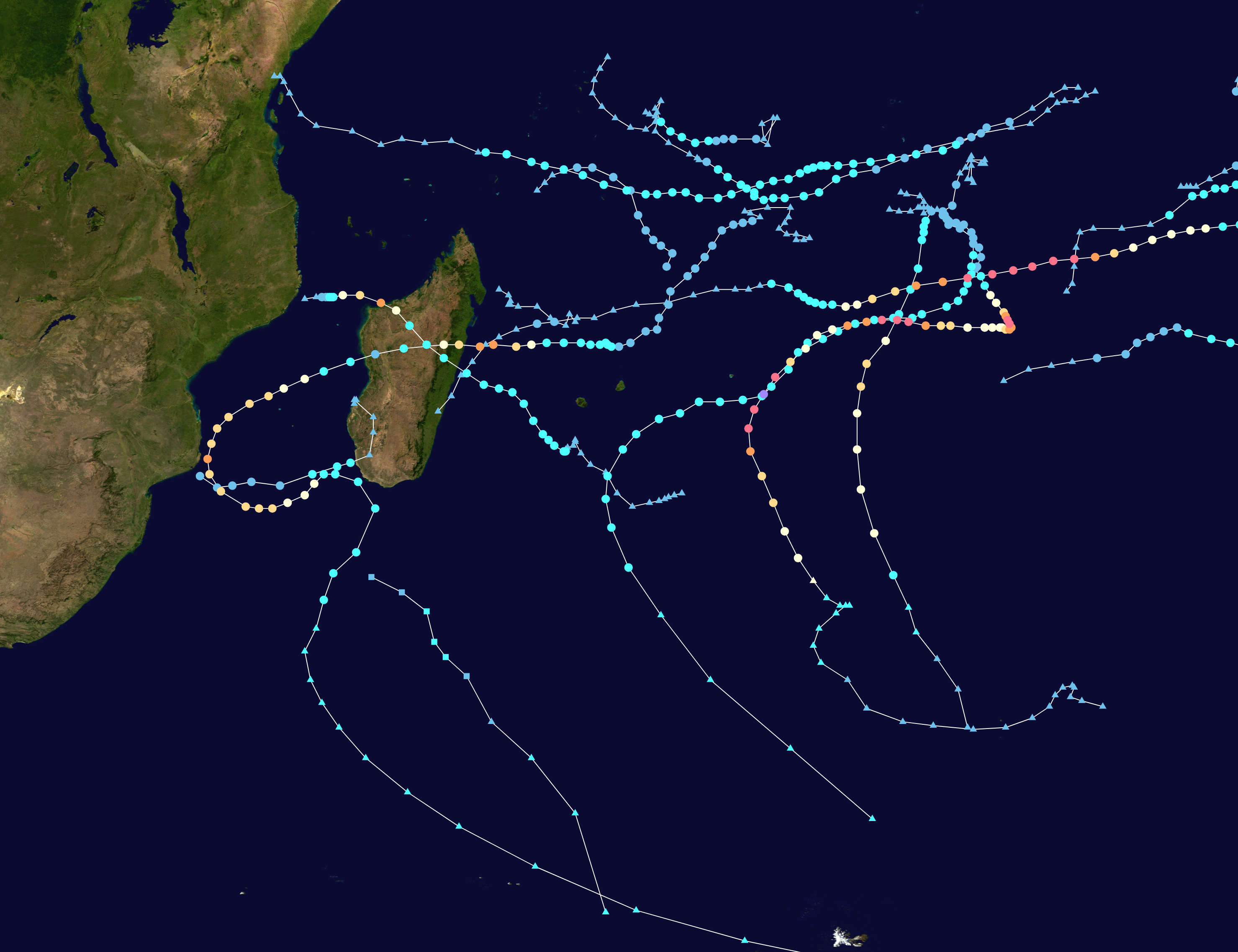
- Season summary map

Seasonal boundaries
- First system formed: 16 July 2025
- Last system dissipated: 27 April 2026

Strongest storm
- By maximum sustained winds: Horacio
  - Maximum winds: 215 km/h (130 mph) (10-minute sustained)
  - Lowest pressure: 947 hPa (mbar)
- By central pressure: Dudzai
  - Maximum winds: 205 km/h (125 mph) (10-minute sustained)
  - Lowest pressure: 937 hPa (mbar)

Seasonal statistics
- Total disturbances: 14, 1 unofficial
- Total depressions: 13, 1 unofficial
- Total storms: 11, 1 unofficial
- Tropical cyclones: 6
- Intense tropical cyclones: 4
- Very intense tropical cyclones: 0
- Total fatalities: 75+
- Total damage: > $2.48 billion (2026 USD) (Third-costliest South-West Indian Ocean cyclone season on record)

Related articles
- 2025–26 Australian region cyclone season; 2025–26 South Pacific cyclone season

The 2025–26 South-West Indian Ocean cyclone season was an active and very destructive South-West Indian Ocean cyclone season. Although only 2 storms did measurable damage, it was the third costliest on record, mainly due to Cyclone Gezani, which itself became the costliest cyclone in Madagascar’s history. It officially began on 15 November 2025, and ended on 30 April 2026, with the exception for Mauritius and the Seychelles, for which it ended on 15 May 2026. These dates conventionally delimit the period of each year when most tropical and subtropical cyclones form in the basin, which is west of 90°E and south of the Equator. However, tropical cyclones can form year-round with any cyclone forming between 1 July 2025 and 30 June 2026, such as 01, Awo, Blossom and Chenge, also part of the season. Tropical and subtropical cyclones in this basin are monitored by the Regional Specialised Meteorological Centre in Réunion and unofficially by the Joint Typhoon Warning Center.

== Seasonal forecasts ==
Record	Moderate Tropical Storm		Tropical Cyclone
Average	10		5
Record high	15 (2018–19)		11 (2018–19)
Record low	3 (1982–83)		0 (1982–83)
Forecast center	Systems		
Météo-France	10–14		5–8
Mauritius Meteorological Services	11–13		—N/a
Forecast center	Chance of below/near/above average		
Météo-France	10%	40%	50%

== Seasonal summary ==
=== Pre-season/early season activity ===
The season began with the crossover of a tropical low from the Australian basin on 16 July. The low was designated Tropical Depression 01 by Météo-France, while the JTWC designated the depression as Tropical Storm 01S a little later. The system did not strengthen and dissipated 2 days later without affecting land. On 7 August, a tropical disturbance formed well north of the Mascarenes, later that day it was upgraded to a tropical depression then subsequently named Awo that evening as it strengthened into a Moderate Tropical Storm. Awo was the first named storm to form in August within the South-West Indian Ocean basin since Severe Tropical Storm Aline in 1969, though Severe Tropical Storm Tony did enter the basin during August in 1979. Awo only briefly survived, encountering high shear and dissipating the next day. On 7 September, Météo–France started monitoring a disturbance south of Diego Garcia. Briefly on 9 September, it intensified into a tropical depression. The system was then classified as a Moderate Tropical Storm and named Blossom, becoming the second named storm of the season. Blossom maintained its intensity in a marginal environment, before degenerating into a remnant low–pressure area on 11 September. On 17 October, a low–pressure area formed near Diego Garcia and was marked by Météo-France as the fourth Zone of Disturbed Weather of the season, the fourth off-season system of the season. After strengthening into a Moderate Tropical Storm, it was named Chenge. Heading westward, the cyclone further strengthened into a Severe Tropical Storm on 22 October before weakening. On 25 October, Chenge degenerated into a remnant low off the coast of Tanzania. Following these early and off-season systems, the basin experienced a prolonged period of inactivity leading into the official start of the season. Activity resumed on 27 December when Tropical Cyclone Grant entered the South-West Indian Ocean from the Australian region, retaining its name as it crossed basin boundaries. Grant dissipated in early January after rapidly intensifying into an Intense Tropical Cyclone in the central part of the basin, far from land.

=== Peak season activity ===
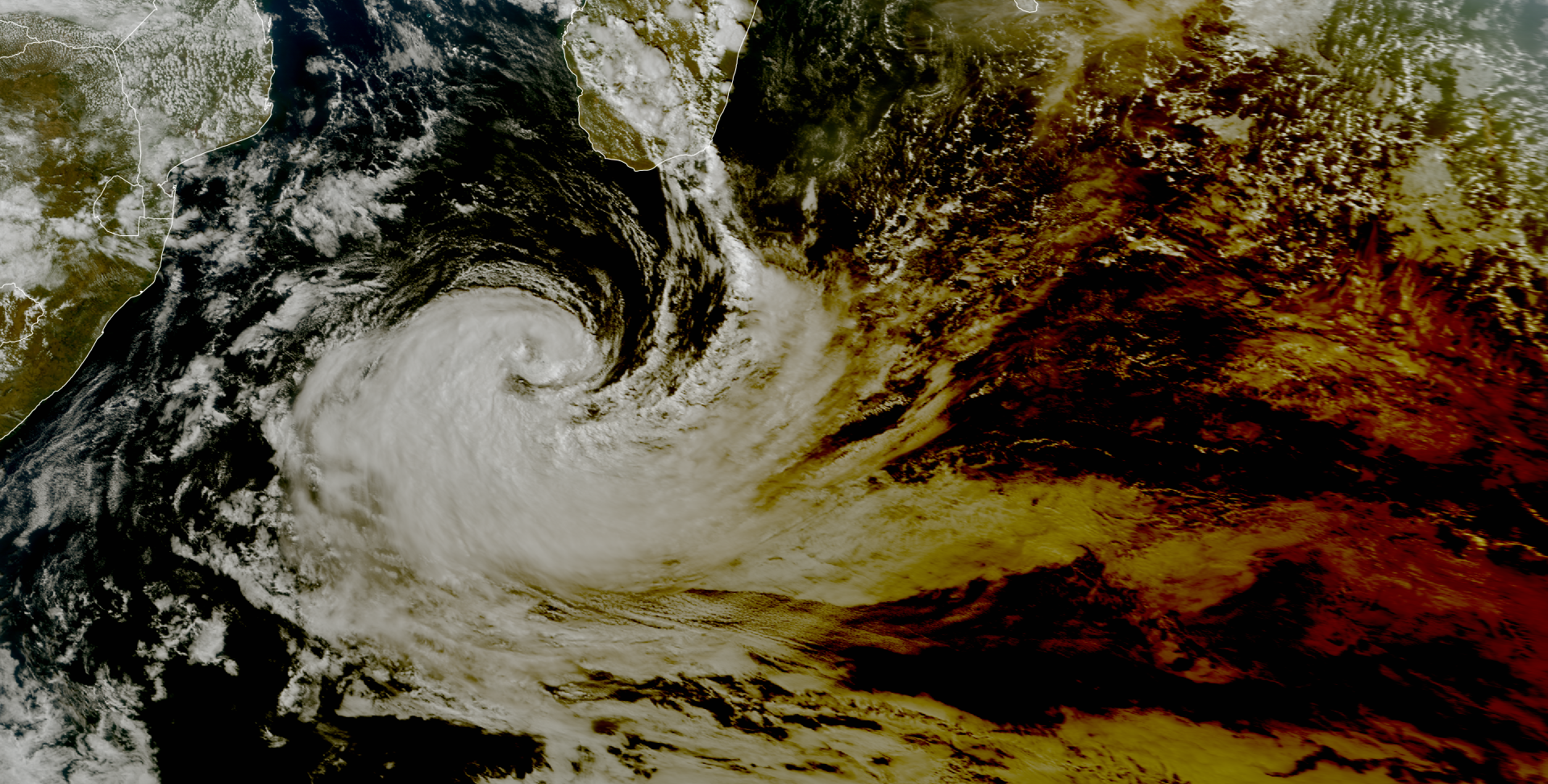
GeoColor satellite imagery of the February 17, 2026 annular solar eclipse nearby Cyclone Gezani at 13:10 UTC

On 8 January, Cyclone Jenna crossed the 90th meridian east from the Australian region into the South-West Indian Ocean basin. Météo-France did not monitor the system, labeling it as a "residual depression". The Joint Typhoon Warning Center continued to monitor the system as a tropical storm for a short time before its degeneration into a remnant low on 9 January. On 10 January, Cyclone Dudzai developed in the central part of the basin, becoming the second intense tropical cyclone of the season. Dudzai’s formation marked a transition to more typical mid-season conditions, characterized by warmer sea-surface temperatures and reduced wind shear, which supported stronger and more sustained cyclonic development within the basin. Dudzai then weakened quickly immediately after intensifying, before accelerating westward and quickly intensified once again, before becoming extratropical as it recurved away from land. While it was dissipating, on 20 January, Ewetse formed and quickly made landfall in southwestern Madagascar as a Moderate Tropical Storm the next day. Six days later, Zone of Disturbed Weather 08 formed but quickly dissipated the following day as it merged into a monsoon trough. Fytia formed the following day and rapidly intensified before making landfall in northwestern Madagascar as a high–end Tropical Cyclone on 31 January. After crossing Madagascar, it dissipated south of Réunion. Twelve were killed in Madagascar by the storm. On 8 February, Gezani formed. It slowly strengthened and made landfall in Madagascar as an Intense Tropical Cyclone, causing over 63 casualties. It later impacted Mozambique as a Tropical Cyclone. On February 24, Cyclone Horacio formed and became a Category 5 tropical cyclone on the SSHWS scale, the first to do so in the Southern Hemisphere since Errol in April 2025, and the first globally in 2026.

=== Late season activity ===
Tropical Depression 12 formed on March 12 but it quickly weakened and dissipated the following day. Cyclone Indusa formed on April 1 and it rapidly intensified into a tropical cyclone on April 4. An extratropical cyclone formed on April 26, it later developed subtropical characteristics, and was named Juluka the following day.

== Systems ==
=== Tropical Depression 01 ===
- Tropical depression (MFR)
- Tropical storm (SSHWS)
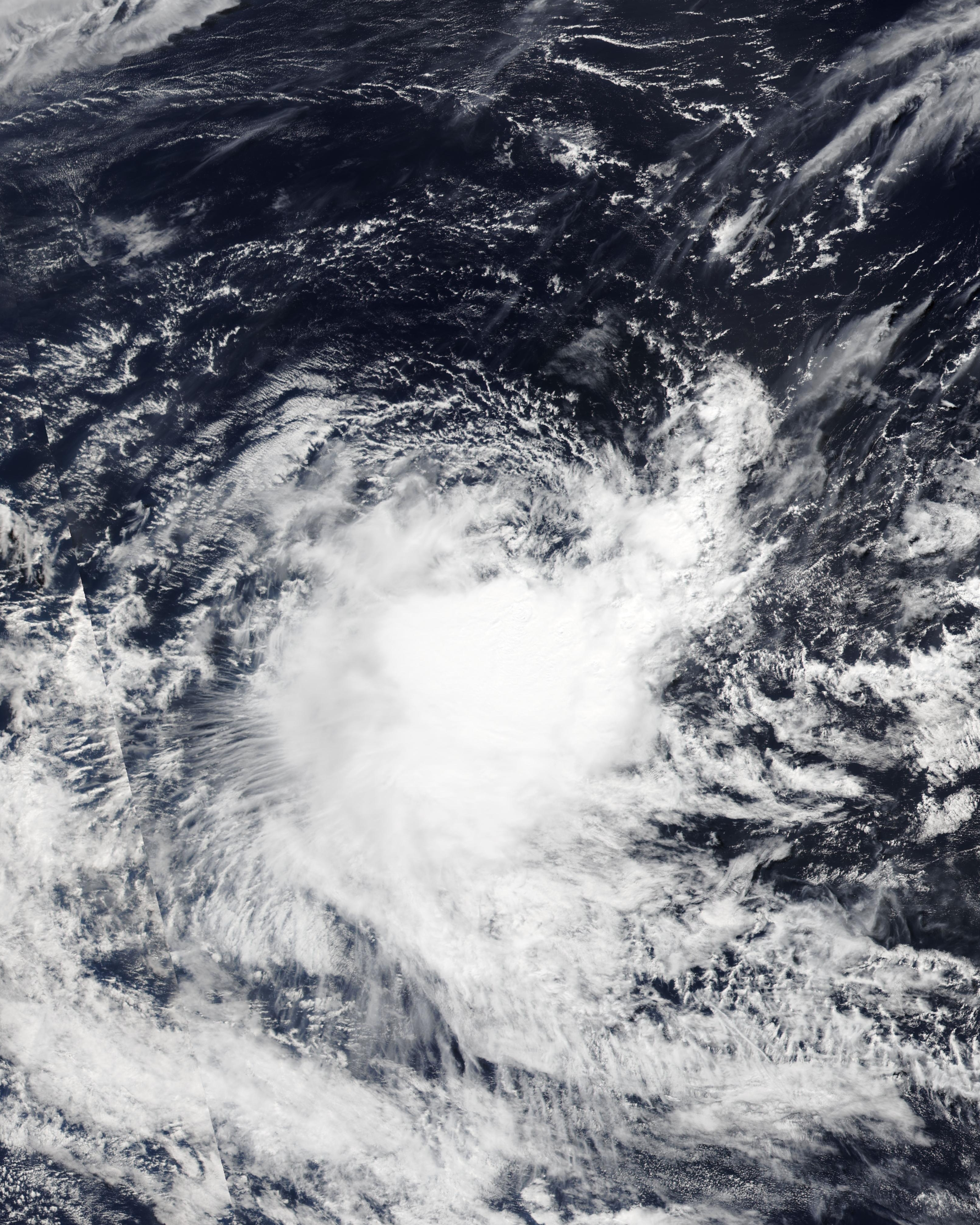
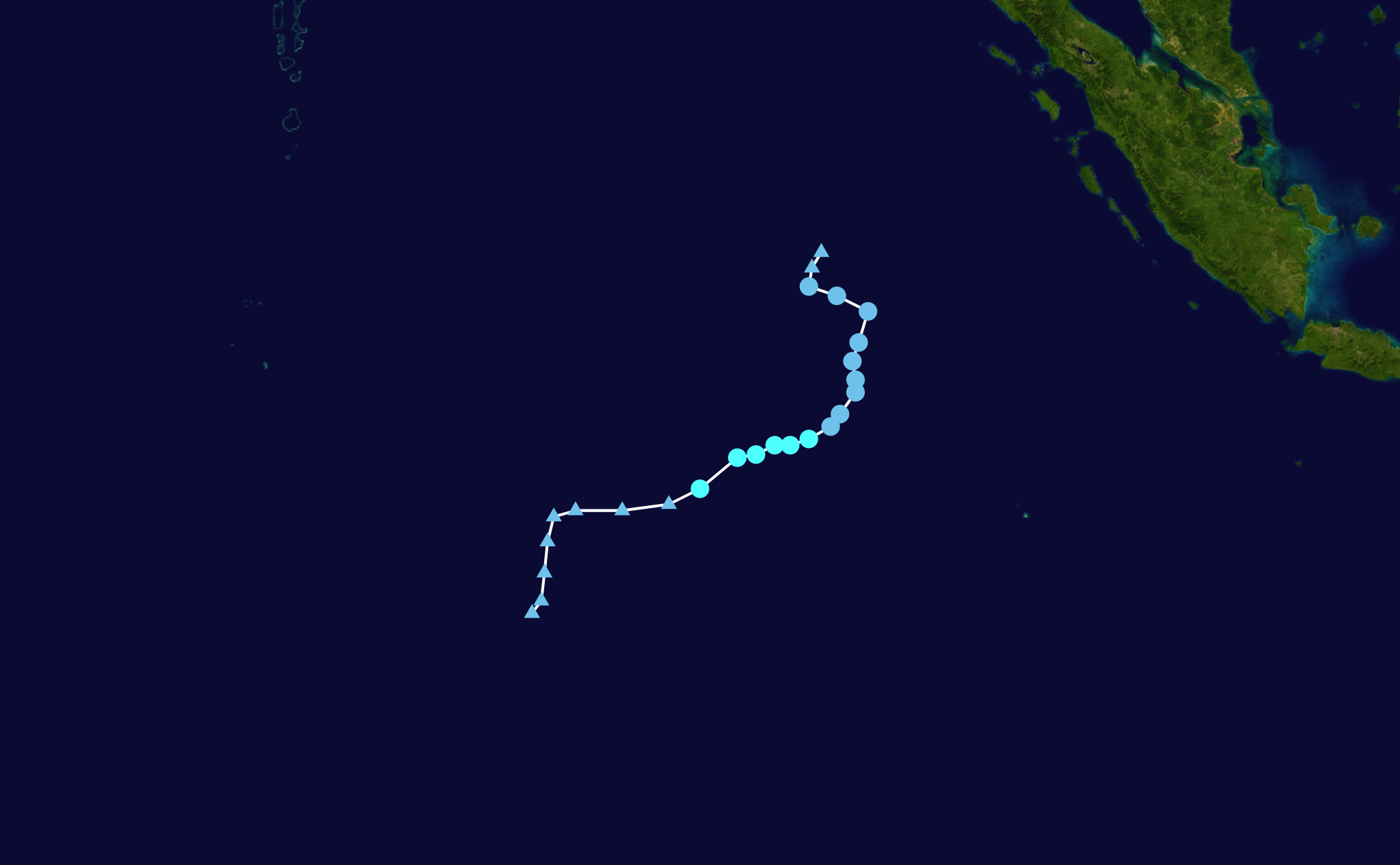
- Duration: 16 July (Entered basin) – 18 July
- Peak intensity: 55 km/h (35 mph) (10-min); 1000 hPa (mbar)

On 16 July, a tropical low moved from the Australian Region into the South-West Indian Ocean, where it was classified as Zone of Disturbed Weather 01 by Météo-France. On the same day, the JTWC upgraded the system to a tropical storm, assigning it the designation 01S. The system moved west-southwestwards into an increasingly unfavourable environment, dissipating on 18 July.

=== Moderate Tropical Storm Awo ===
- Moderate tropical storm (MFR)
- Tropical storm (SSHWS)
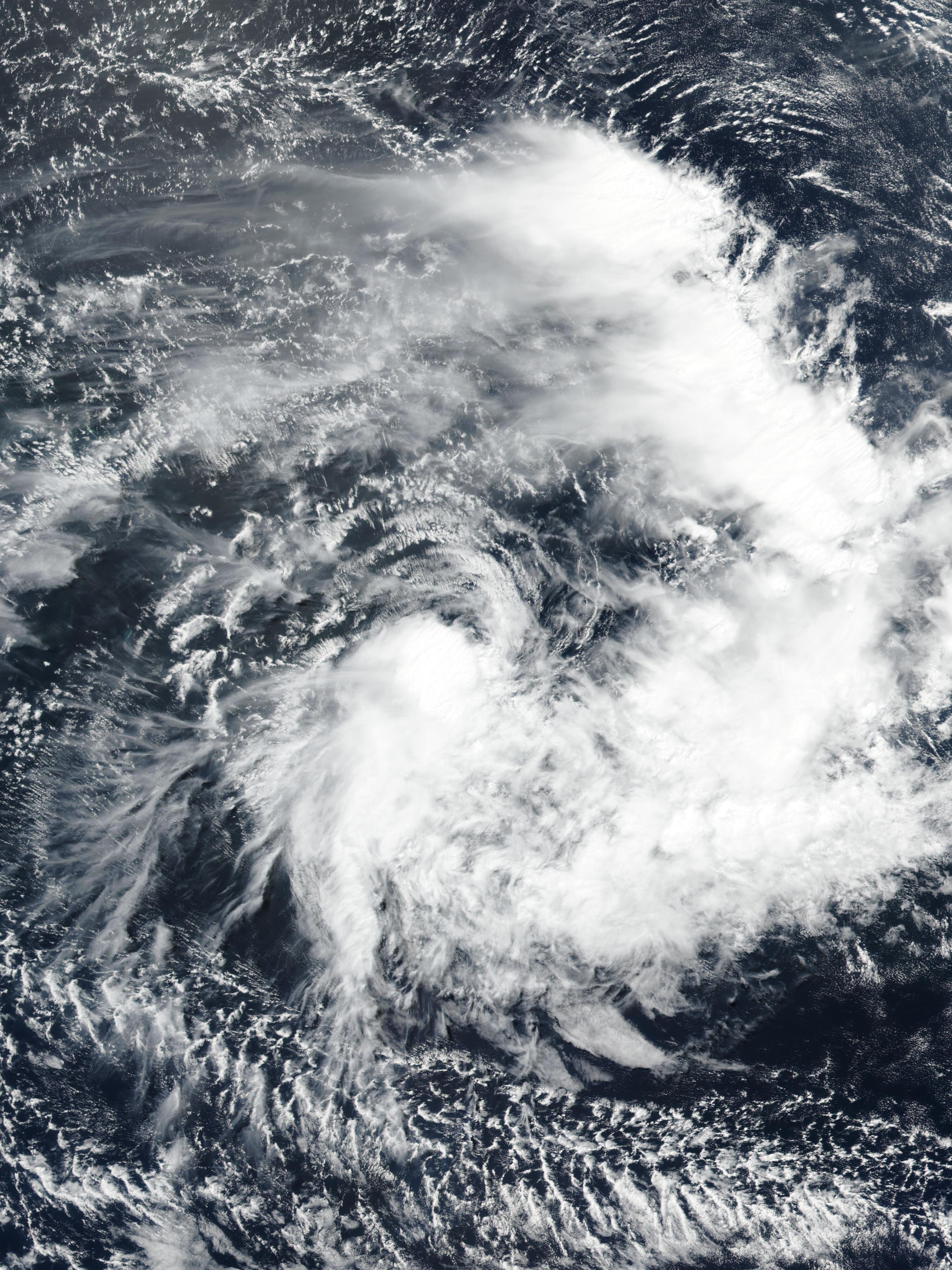
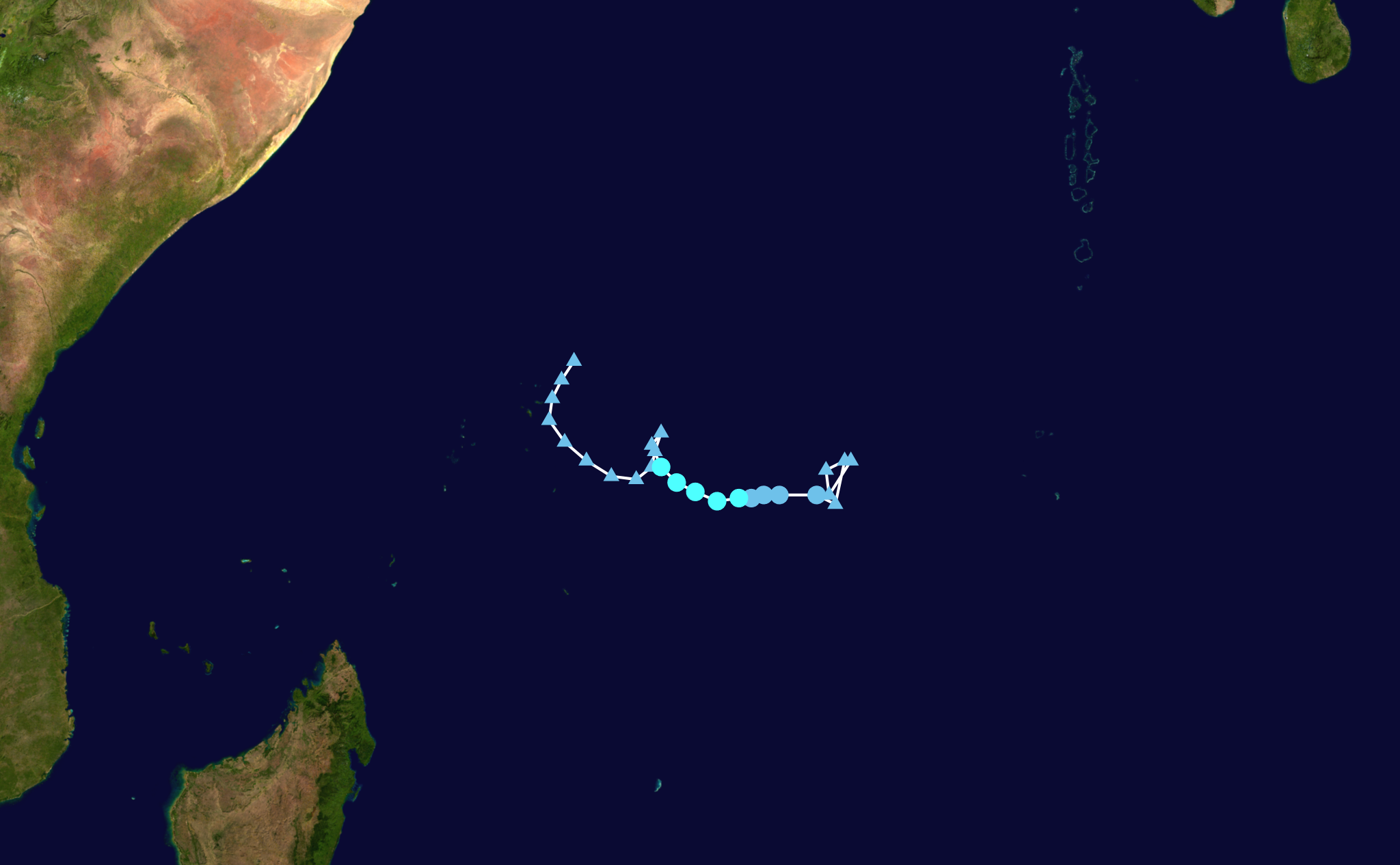
- Duration: 6 August – 8 August
- Peak intensity: 75 km/h (45 mph) (10-min); 1000 hPa (mbar)

On 6 August, a tropical disturbance formed in the central Indian Ocean and on the northeast of Madagascar. A day later, the JTWC designated the system as Tropical Storm 02S, while MFR designated the system as Tropical Depression 02. Six hours later, Mauritius Meteorological Services upgraded it to moderate tropical storm status and named it Awo. Awo is the first named storm to form in August within the South-West Indian Ocean basin since Severe Tropical Storm Aline in 1969, though Severe Tropical Storm Tony did enter the basin during August in 1979. Awo struggled to intensify due to persistent easterly wind shear and limited upper‑level outflow, which prevented further organization. Throughout its lifespan, the system remained poorly structured, with most convection displaced away from the low‑level center. Increasing shear and dry air intrusion caused Awo to weaken steadily before dissipating.

=== Moderate Tropical Storm Blossom ===
- Moderate tropical storm (MFR)
- Tropical storm (SSHWS)
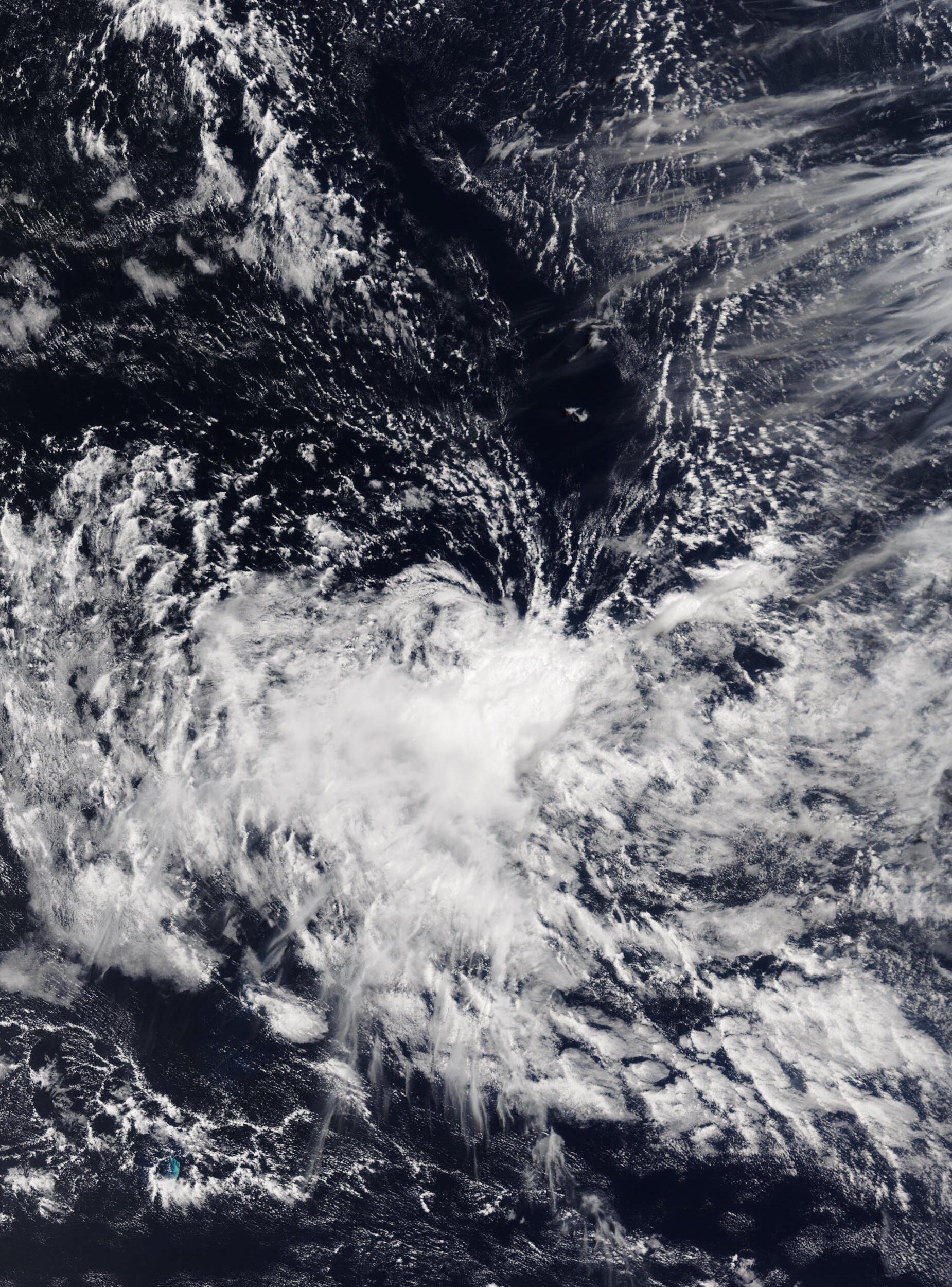
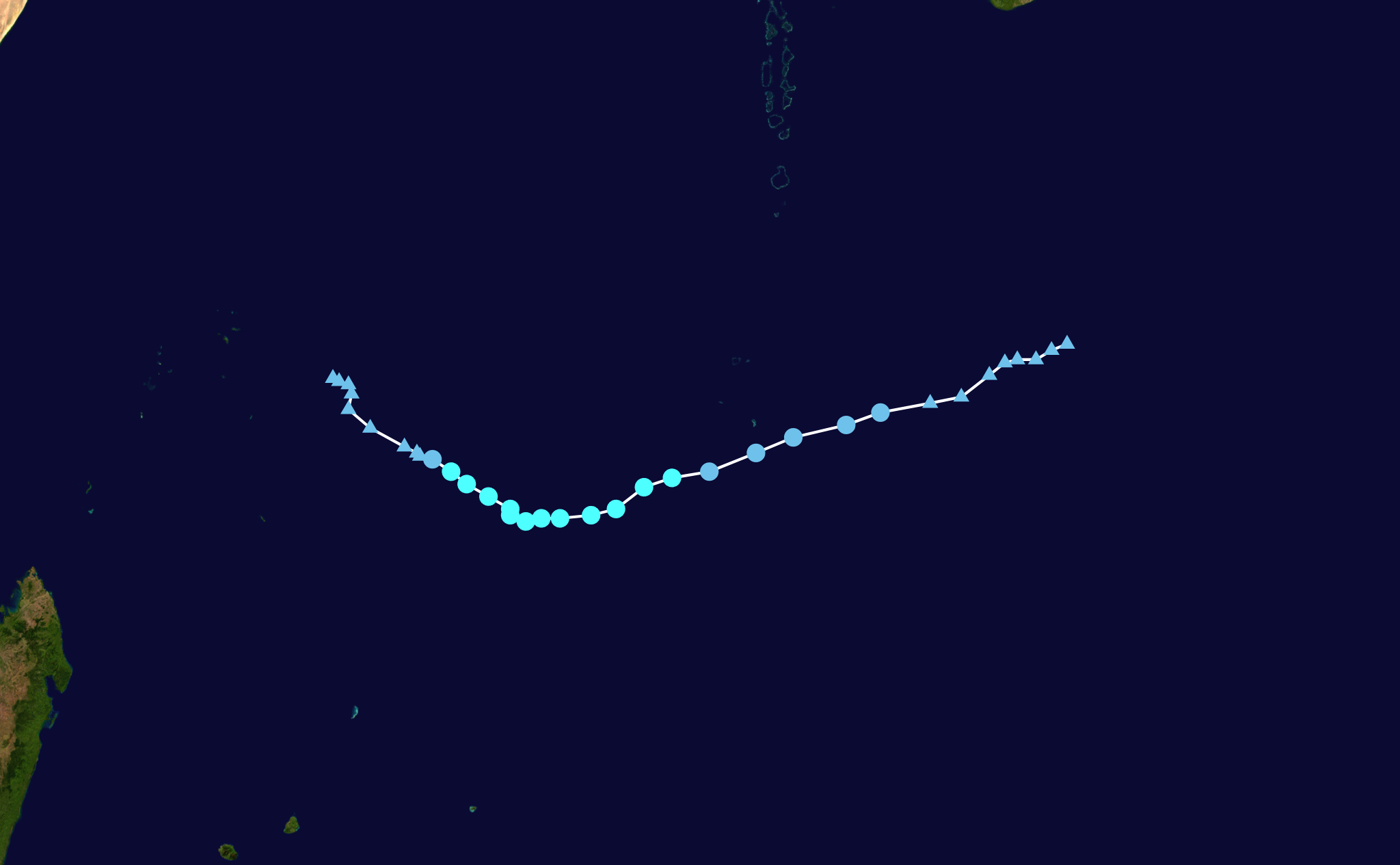
- Duration: 9 September – 12 September
- Peak intensity: 65 km/h (40 mph) (10-min); 1003 hPa (mbar)

Meteo-France Réunion began monitoring a disturbance on 7 September. At 10:00 a.m. (0600Z) on 9 September, MFR upgraded it to Tropical Depression status, marking it as Tropical Depression 03. By the next advisory it weakened back to a Tropical Disturbance. On 10 September it once again intensified into a Tropical Depression. On 11 September, it strengthened once again, this time strengthening into a Moderate Tropical Storm, thus receiving the name Blossom. It weakened shortly after and dissipated the next day.

=== Severe Tropical Storm Chenge ===
- Severe tropical storm (MFR)
- Tropical storm (SSHWS)
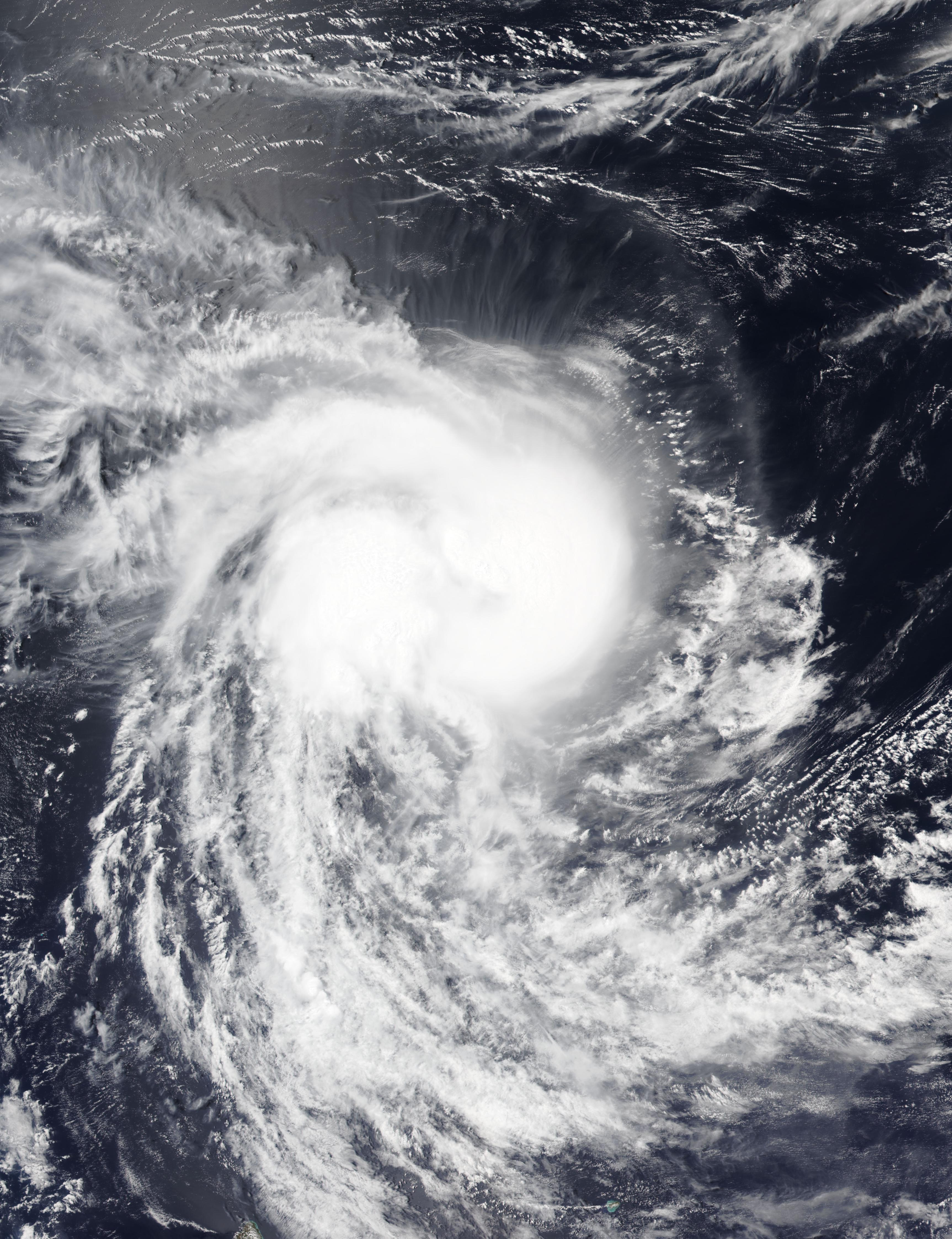
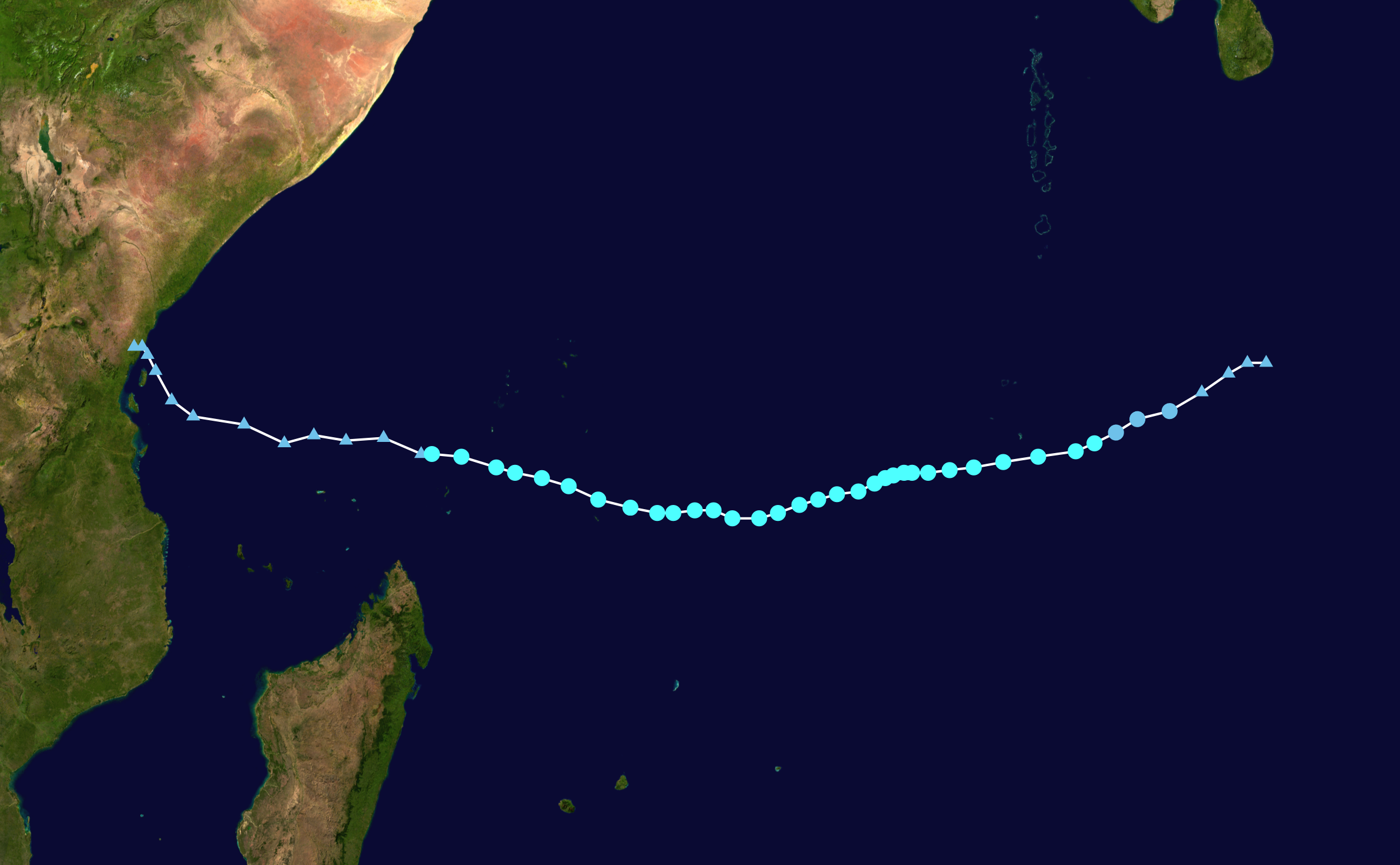
- Duration: 17 October – 25 October
- Peak intensity: 95 km/h (60 mph) (10-min); 985 hPa (mbar)

On 17 October, a low–pressure area formed near Diego Garcia and was marked by Météo-France as the fourth Zone of Disturbed Weather of the season. It was then classified as Moderate Tropical Storm Chenge. Early on 22 October, Chenge intensified into a Severe Tropical Storm. Chenge then went on to move in a mostly western trajectory, passing north of Madagascar before entering increasingly unfavorable conditions and weakening into a tropical depression. Chenge dissipated on 25 October. After dissipation, the remnants of Chenge were absorbed into a broader monsoonal flow over East Africa.

As the storm passed north of Madagascar, only minor effects such as increased swells and occasional rainbands were observed over nearby islands, including the Glorioso Islands and Juan de Nova. No significant damage was reported and producing scattered rainfall over parts of Kenya and Tanzania without causing notable impacts.

=== Intense Tropical Cyclone Grant ===
- Intense tropical cyclone (MFR)
- Category 4 tropical cyclone (SSHWS)
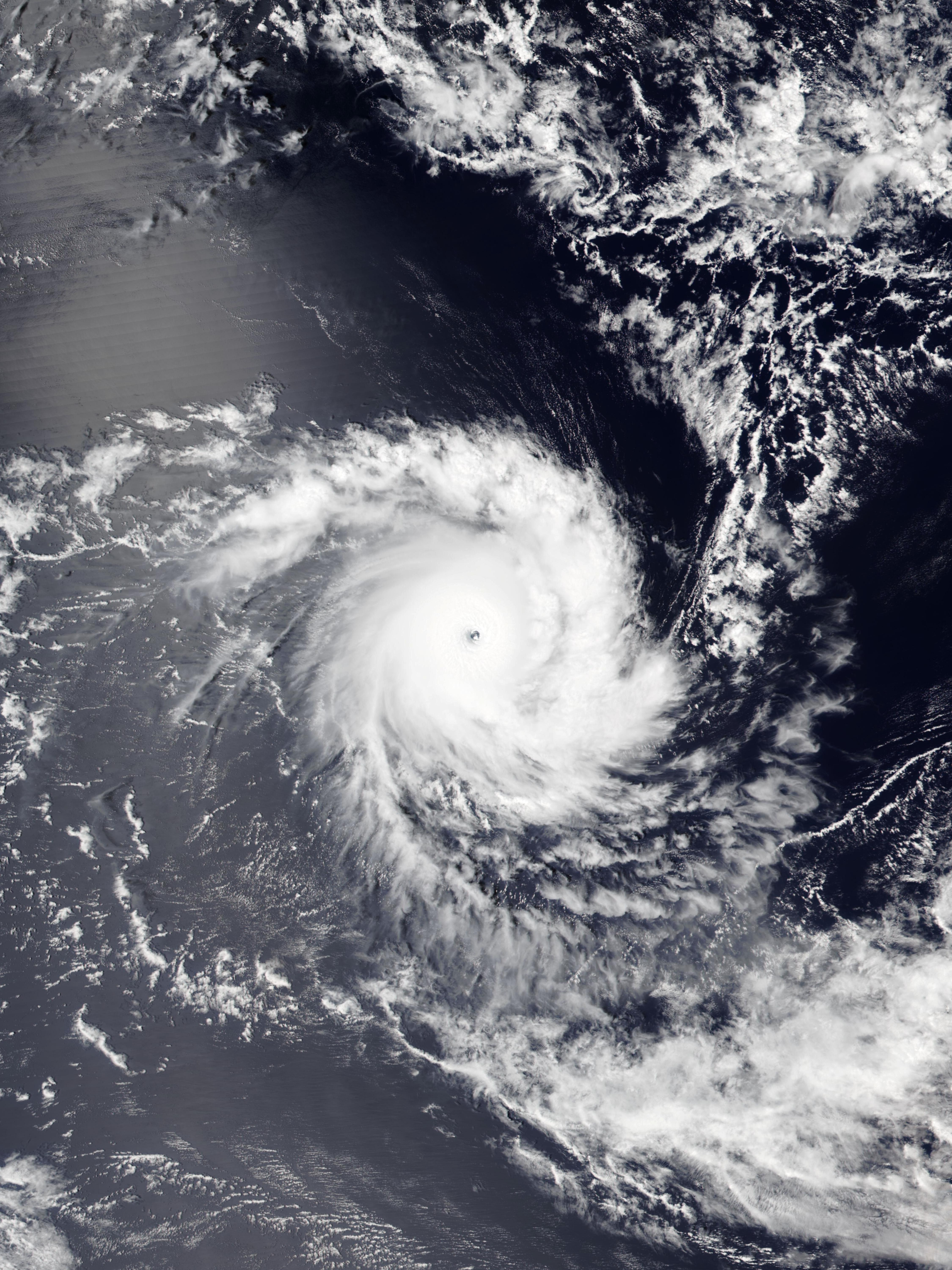
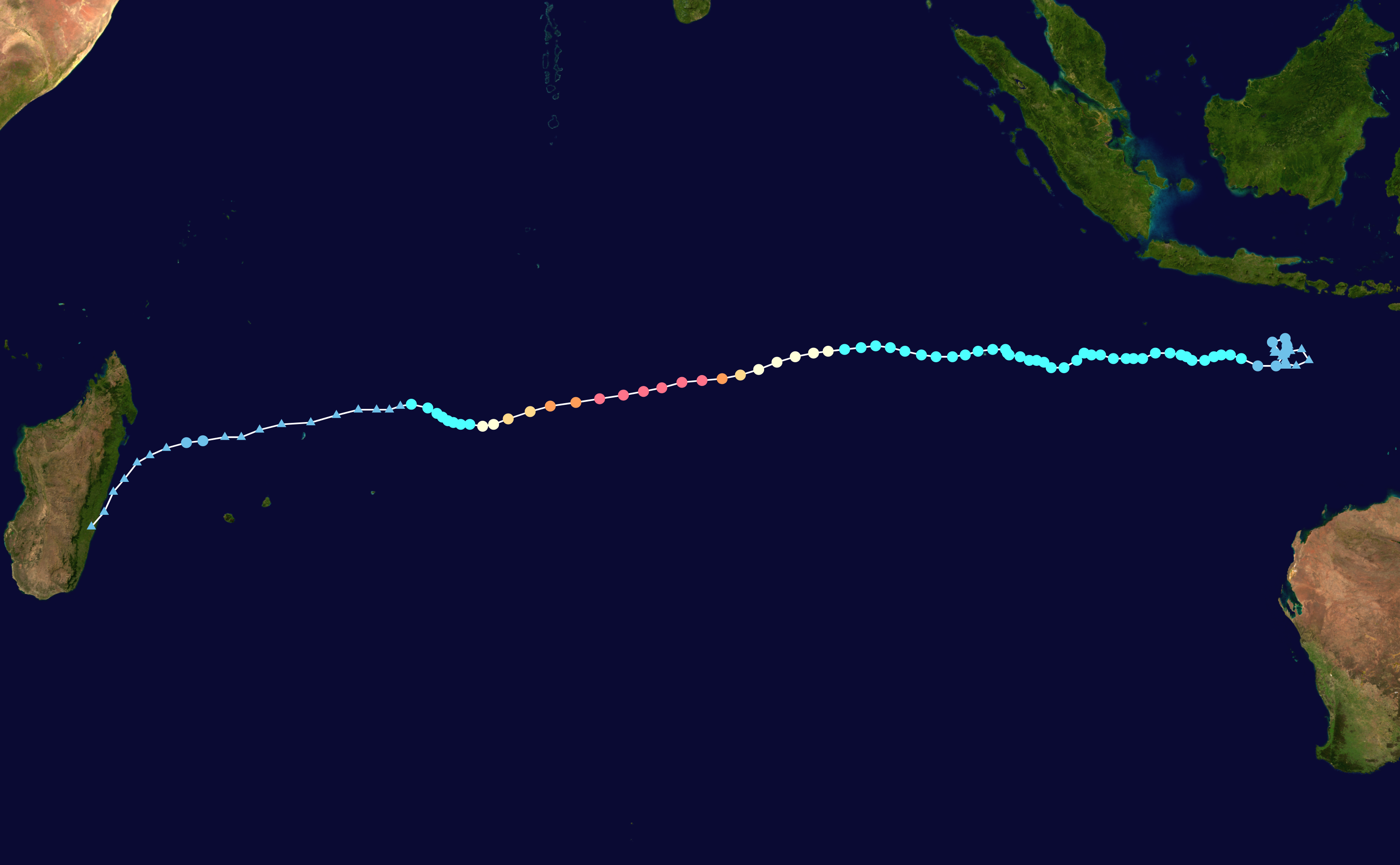
- Duration: 27 December (Entered basin) – 6 January
- Peak intensity: 205 km/h (125 mph) (10-min); 940 hPa (mbar)

On 27 December, Grant entered the basin from the Australian Region at 10:00 RET (06:00 UTC) as a severe tropical storm. Twenty-four hours later, the system became a tropical cyclone. After rapid intensification, Grant was upgraded to an intense tropical cyclone at 0:00 UTC on December 29, equivalent to a Category 3 hurricane on the Saffir-Simpson scale, about 1300 km southeast of Diego Garcia, the first major cyclone of the season in the South-West Indian Ocean Basin. At 15:00 UTC, the Joint Typhoon Warning Center (JTWC) upgraded it to category 4. Grant remained at slightly below its peak intensity for more than 42 hours before weakening back to a tropical cyclone, according to RSMC La Réunion, on December 31 at 12:00 UTC, as it entered an area of dry air and upper-level wind shear. It was then 900 km east-northeast of Rodrigues. On January 1, 2026, at 6:00 UTC, Grant was downgraded to a severe tropical storm and then to a moderate tropical storm 6 hours later, more than 600 km northeast of Rodrigues. The next day at 12:00 UTC, the system was downgraded again, this time to a tropical depression. On Sunday, January 4th, the center of the system passed about 85 kilometres (53 mi) North of St. Brandon, bringing bands of heavy showers and thunderstorms with swells of 3 to 4 meters. On January 5, the Regional Specialized Meteorological Centre (RSMC) La Réunion issued its final bulletin for Grant, which had weakened into a tropical disturbance passing between 50 and 100 km southeast of Tromelin Island. The remnants of the system were heading towards the southern coast of the Toamasina Province in Madagascar, which it was expected to reach within two days.

=== Intense Tropical Cyclone Dudzai ===
- Intense tropical cyclone (MFR)
- Category 4 tropical cyclone (SSHWS)
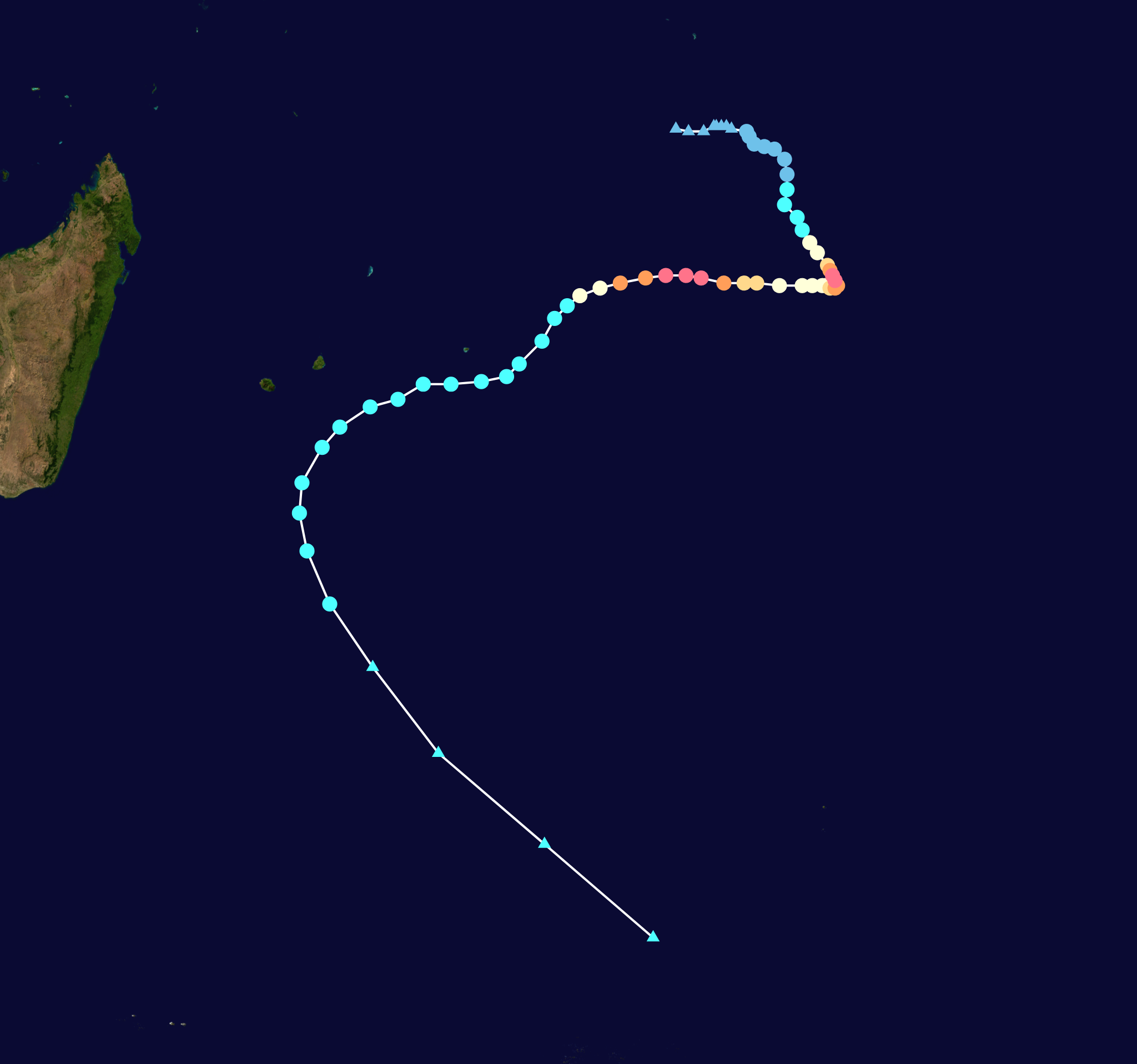
- Duration: 10 January – 21 January
- Peak intensity: 205 km/h (125 mph) (10-min); 937 hPa (mbar)

At 12:00 UTC on 10 January, the RSMC La Réunion estimated that a tropical disturbance it had been monitoring for a few days was sufficiently organized to be declared a tropical depression at 800 km southeast of the Chagos Archipelago. Later that day, it was given the name Dudzai as it intensified into a moderate tropical storm. Dudzai would then strengthen into a severe tropical storm the following day. By 12 January, it had rapidly intensified into an intense tropical cyclone. Dudzai then encountered less favorable conditions and its very slow movement produced an upwelling of cooler water from the depths, all leading to a gradual weakening. On 13 January, its trajectory also turned westward. On 14 January, the system temporarily weakened back to a strong tropical storm, while accelerating towards the Mascarene Islands, before returning to a tropical cyclone with an improvement in environmental conditions. On 15 January, Dudzai restrengthened into an intense tropical cyclone and increased its gale-force wind radius. On 16 January, Dudzai reached its second peak intensity with maximum sustained winds of 195 km/h and a minimum central pressure of 945 millibars. Soon after reaching its peak intensity the cyclone began to weaken due to an eyewall replacement cycle. On 17 January, Dudzai weakened back into a severe tropical storm and a cyclone warning was issued for Rodrigues island by the Mauritius Meteorological Services. On 18 January, the center of the system moved approximately 180 km southeast of the island where Air Mauritius had cancelled all flights to and from Rodrigues. The storm then passed approximately 300 km southeast of Réunion and Mauritius, both of which were placed on weather warning due to the effects of the cyclonic swell on sea conditions and potential of coastal flooding. Subsequently, Dudzai's track curved southward and then southeastward, and on 21 January, it passed south of the 30th parallel south, reaching colder waters and becoming extratropical, eventually merging with a frontal boundary.

=== Severe Tropical Storm Ewetse ===
- Severe tropical storm (MFR)
- Tropical storm (SSHWS)
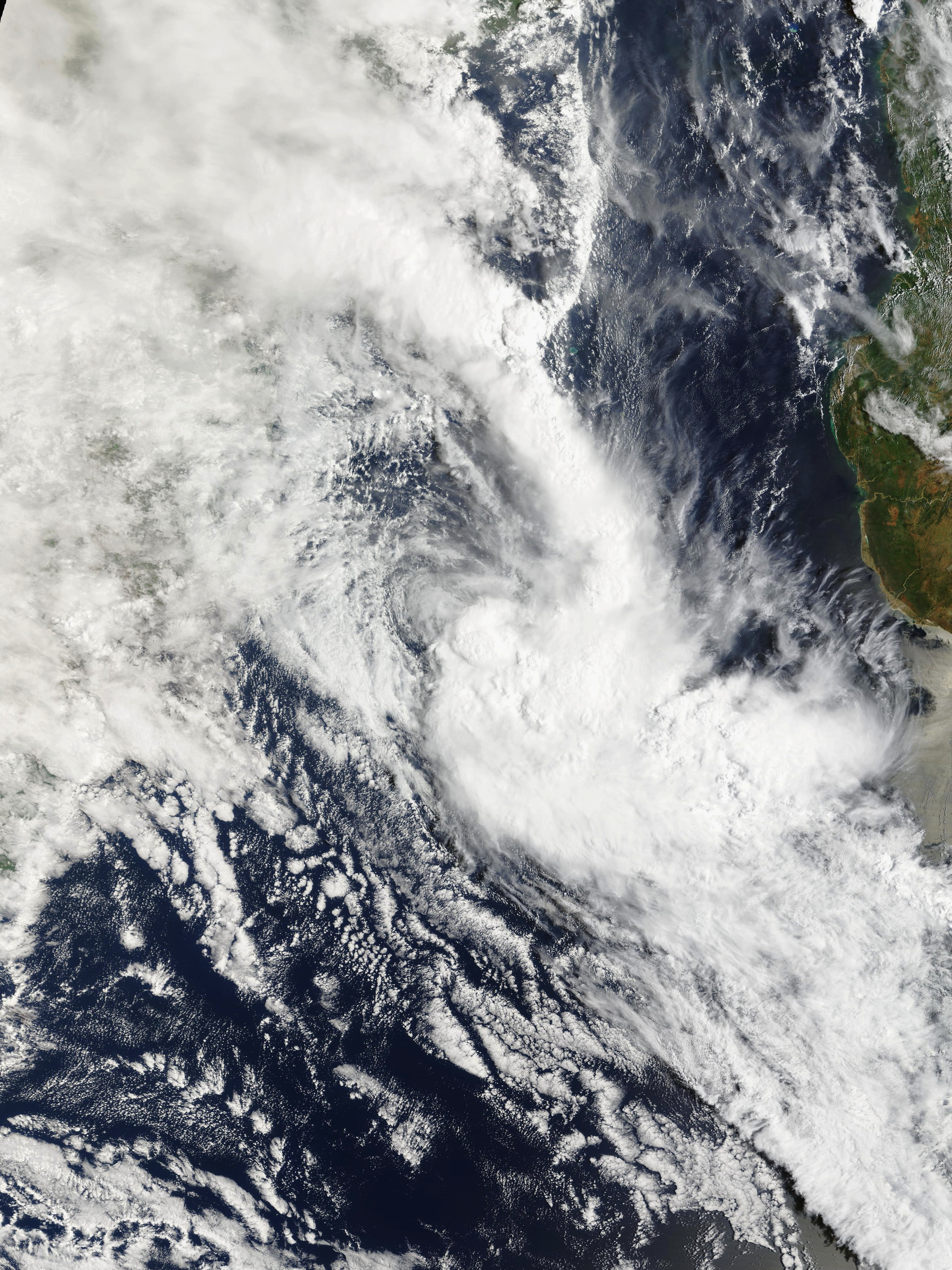
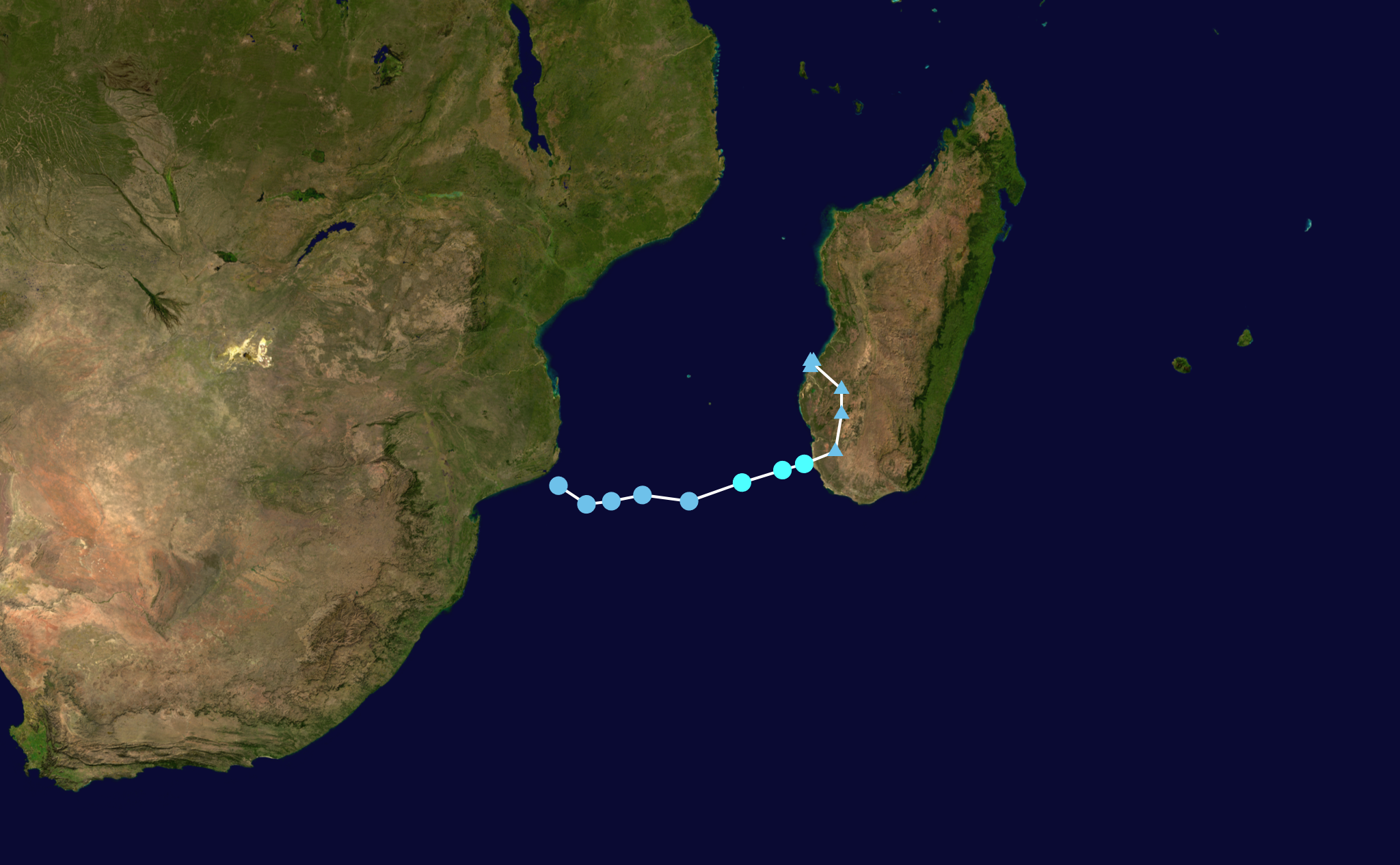
- Duration: 19 January – 21 January
- Peak intensity: 95 km/h (60 mph) (10-min); 992 hPa (mbar)

On 20 January, MFR started monitoring a non-tropical low pressure area along a frontal boundary in the southern Mozambique Channel for possible development. Later that day it was upgraded into a tropical depression. A few hours after that, it was upgraded to Moderate tropical storm, thus receiving the name Ewetse. The storm made landfall near Itampolo shortly after 6:00 UTC on the 21st and weakened rapidly over the mountainous terrain as it moved north. The RSMC La Réunion issued its final bulletin at 12:00 UTC.

In Mozambique, although the storm’s centre remained offshore, Ewetse’s outer bands exacerbated a severe humanitarian crisis. The country was already under a national red alert due to weeks of torrential rain that had flooded the Limpopo and Incomati river basins. The storm generated a storm surge of 0.7 m (2.3 ft) near Ambanhe and brought additional heavy rainfall to the Gaza and Inhambane provinces, where over 600,000 people had already been affected by flooding.

In Madagascar, Ewetse primarily impacted the Toliara Province. While wind damage was limited, the system delivered significant rainfall, with totals exceeding 150 mm (5.9 inches) in local areas. These rains triggered flash flooding in the southern districts, though they were also noted for providing some relief to regions that had been suffering from prolonged drought. No fatalities were directly attributed to the storm's landfall, but local authorities remained on high alert as the system moved through areas with high vulnerability and poor drainage infrastructure.

=== Tropical Cyclone Fytia ===
- Tropical cyclone (MFR)
- Category 3 tropical cyclone (SSHWS)
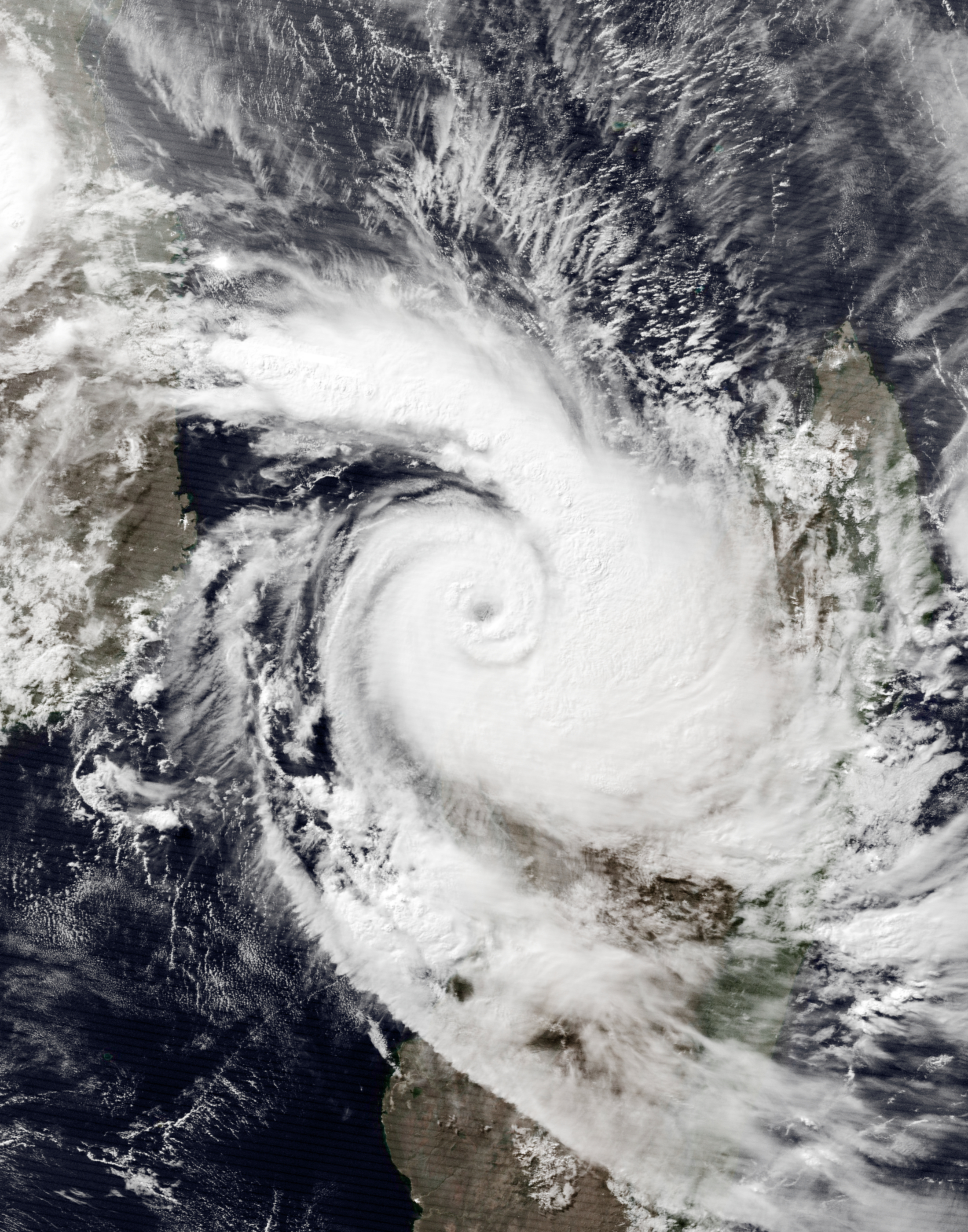
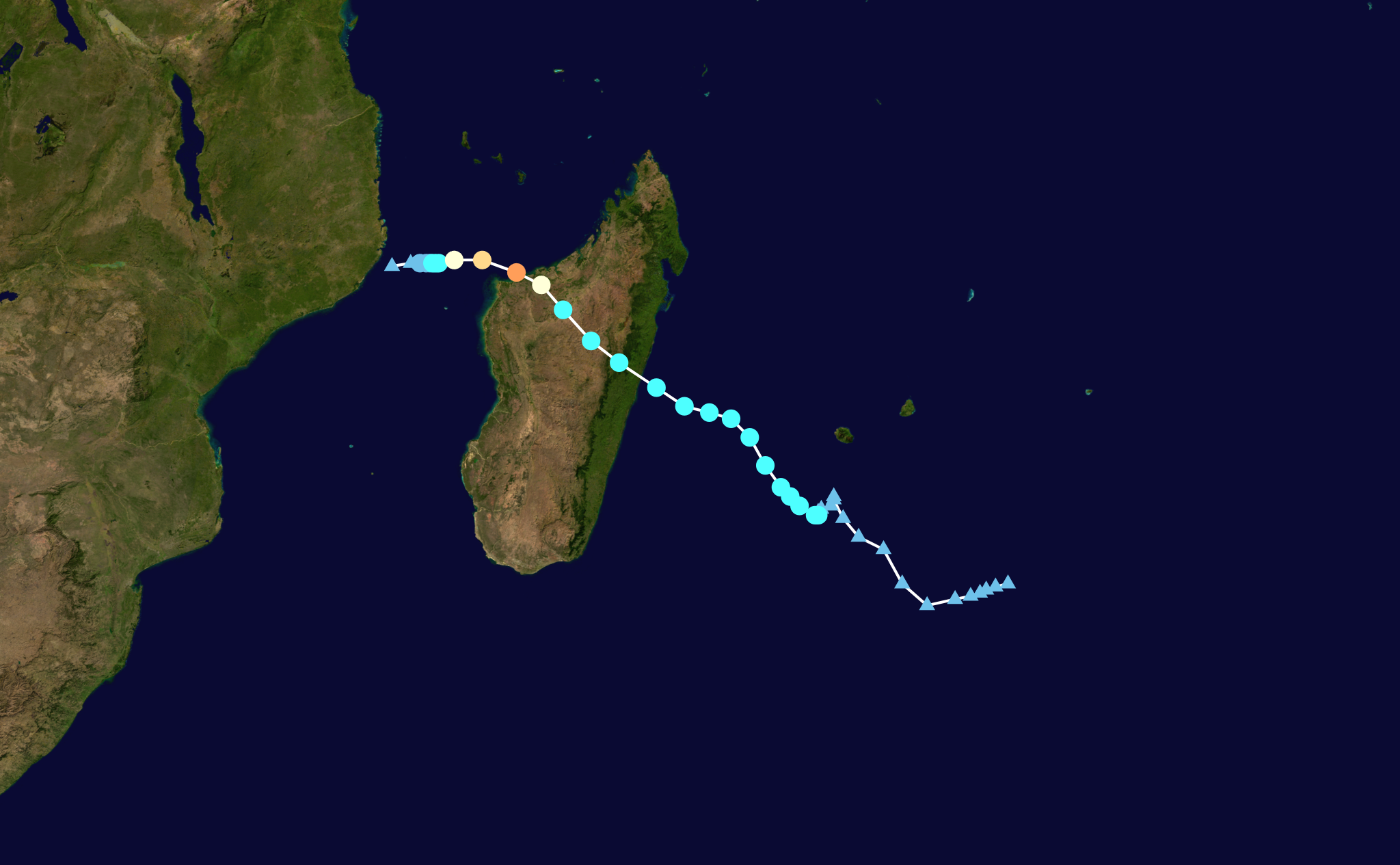
- Duration: 29 January – 4 February
- Peak intensity: 155 km/h (100 mph) (10-min); 960 hPa (mbar)

On 28 January, Météo-France (MFR) began tracking an area of low pressure, designated as Zone of Disturbed Weather 09, located in the Mozambique Channel. The system formed along a convergence zone between the Comoros and the northwest coast of Madagascar over very warm waters with light wind shear. The disturbance was relatively shallow with a disorganized cloud pattern, a peak 10-minute sustained winds of 45 km/h (30 mph) and a minimum central pressure of 1009 hPa. On January 30, 09 was upgraded to a moderate tropical storm, giving it the name Fytia. Fytia later went through rapid intensification, becoming a tropical cyclone after 12 hours. The cyclone reached a peak intensity of 155 km/h (100 mph) and 965 hectopascals (28.50 inHg) as it made landfall near Soalala around 01:30–02:00 UTC on 31 January. The system became the strongest cyclone to make landfall in Mahajanga province since Andry in 1983, equal to Belna in 2019. Upon crossing Madagascar, the system had weakened considerably. However, after re-emerging over the open Indian Ocean, Fytia began to strengthen once more on 2 February. This window of intensification was short-lived, as the system became disheveled on the following day, and ultimately degenerated into a remnant low later that day.

Fytia left 12 people dead and seven others injured in Madagascar. Significant flooding considerably damaged northern parts of the island, affecting more than 70,000 people and displacing nearly 28,000. Aon estimated that losses from Fytia totaled to US$10 million. As of March 6, 2026, economic losses amounted to at least US$475 million.

=== Intense Tropical Cyclone Gezani ===
- Intense tropical cyclone (MFR)
- Category 3 tropical cyclone (SSHWS)
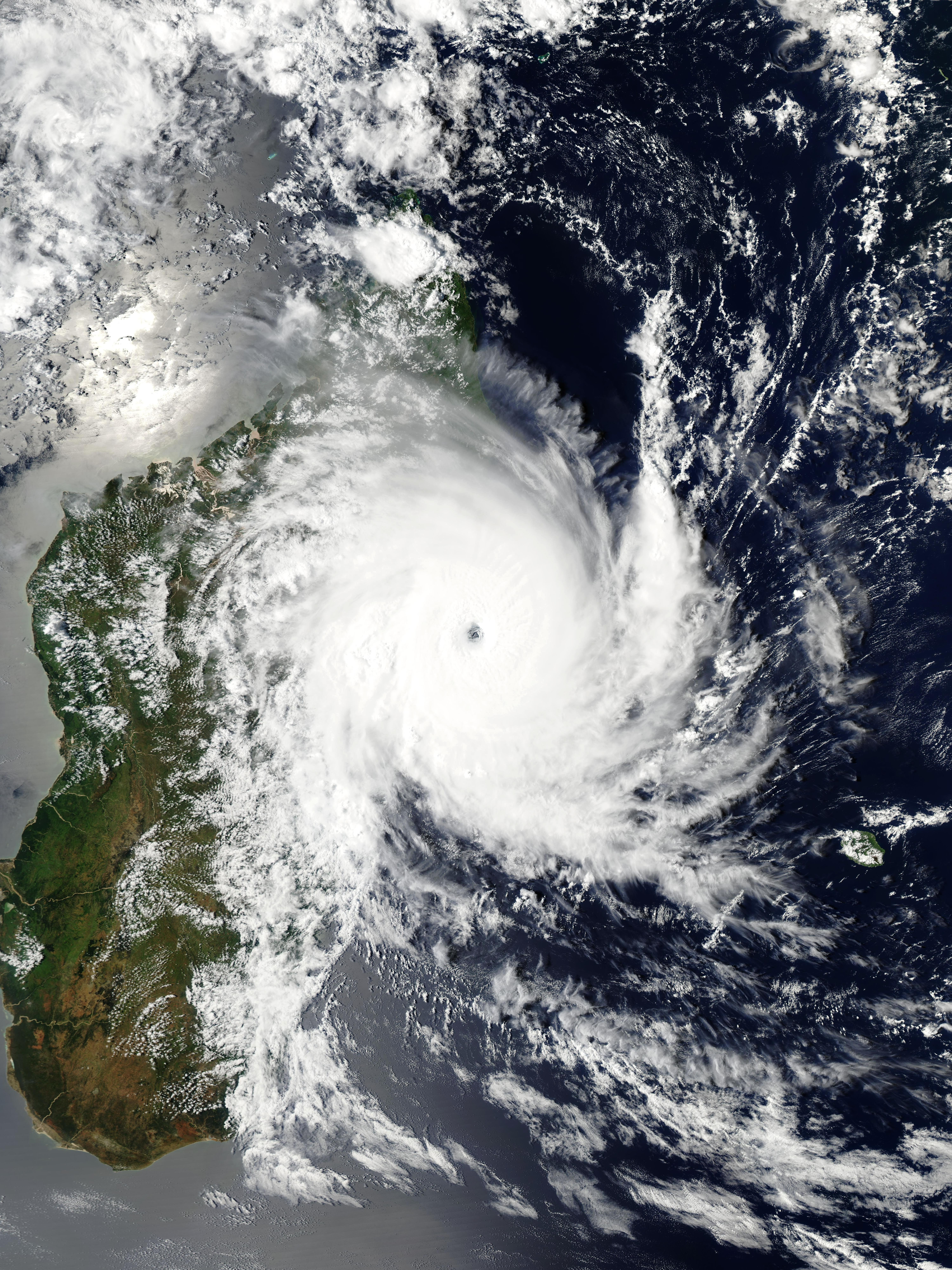
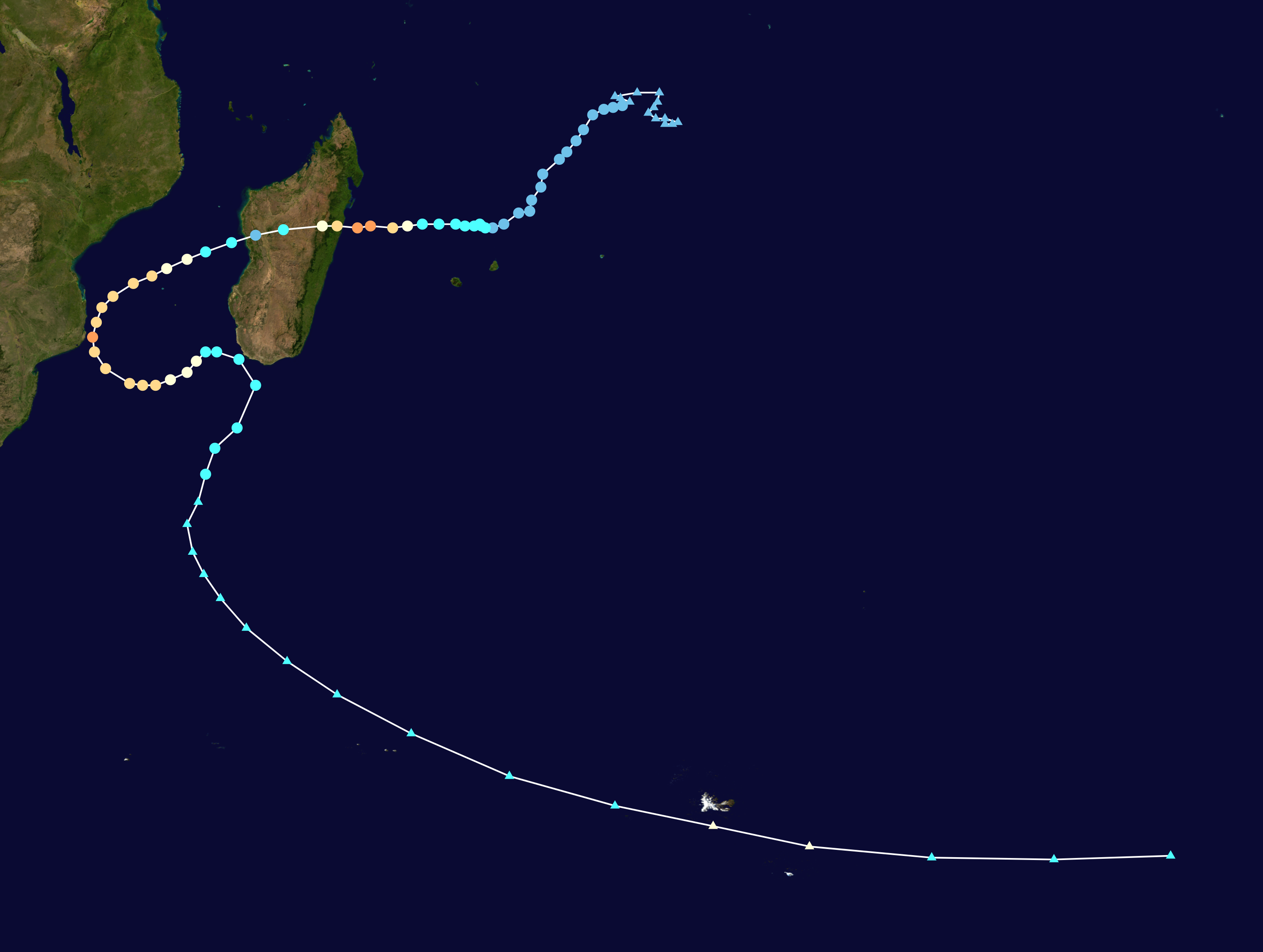
- Duration: 4 February – 18 February
- Peak intensity: 195 km/h (120 mph) (10-min); 952 hPa (mbar)

On 4 February, Météo-France began tracking an area of low pressure, designated as Zone of Disturbed Weather 10. It was then upgraded to a Tropical Depression on 6 February, and then upgraded to a Moderate Tropical Storm on 8 February, earning the name Gezani. After that it rapidly intensified to become the third intense tropical cyclone this season, and made landfall on Toamasina, Madagascar at peak intensity on 10 February. Gezani quickly reemerged back into the Mozambique Channel as a moderate tropical storm after it made landfall on Madagascar, it rapidly reorganized and reintensified into a Tropical Cyclone, and then reached Intense Tropical Cyclone status for the second time while skimming Mozambique. As it moved southeast away from Mozambique, it started to weaken, and then curved northeast towards southern Madagascar. It rapidly weakened to a moderate tropical storm and then back to a tropical cyclone as it neared Madagascar again, until it curved southeast and weakened to a severe tropical storm, not making landfall.

In Toamasina, buildings and walls collapsed, power poles and trees were downed, and roofs were blown off buildings. At least 35 deaths, six missing and 374 injuries were recorded, with over 3,200 homes damaged or destroyed and 8,8000 people displaced. Malagasy president Michael Randrianirina said 75% of Toamasina had been destroyed by the storm. Aon estimated that losses from Gezani totaled to US$150 million. As of March 6, 2026, economic losses amounted to at least US$2 billion.

=== Intense Tropical Cyclone Horacio ===
- Intense tropical cyclone (MFR)
- Category 5 tropical cyclone (SSHWS)
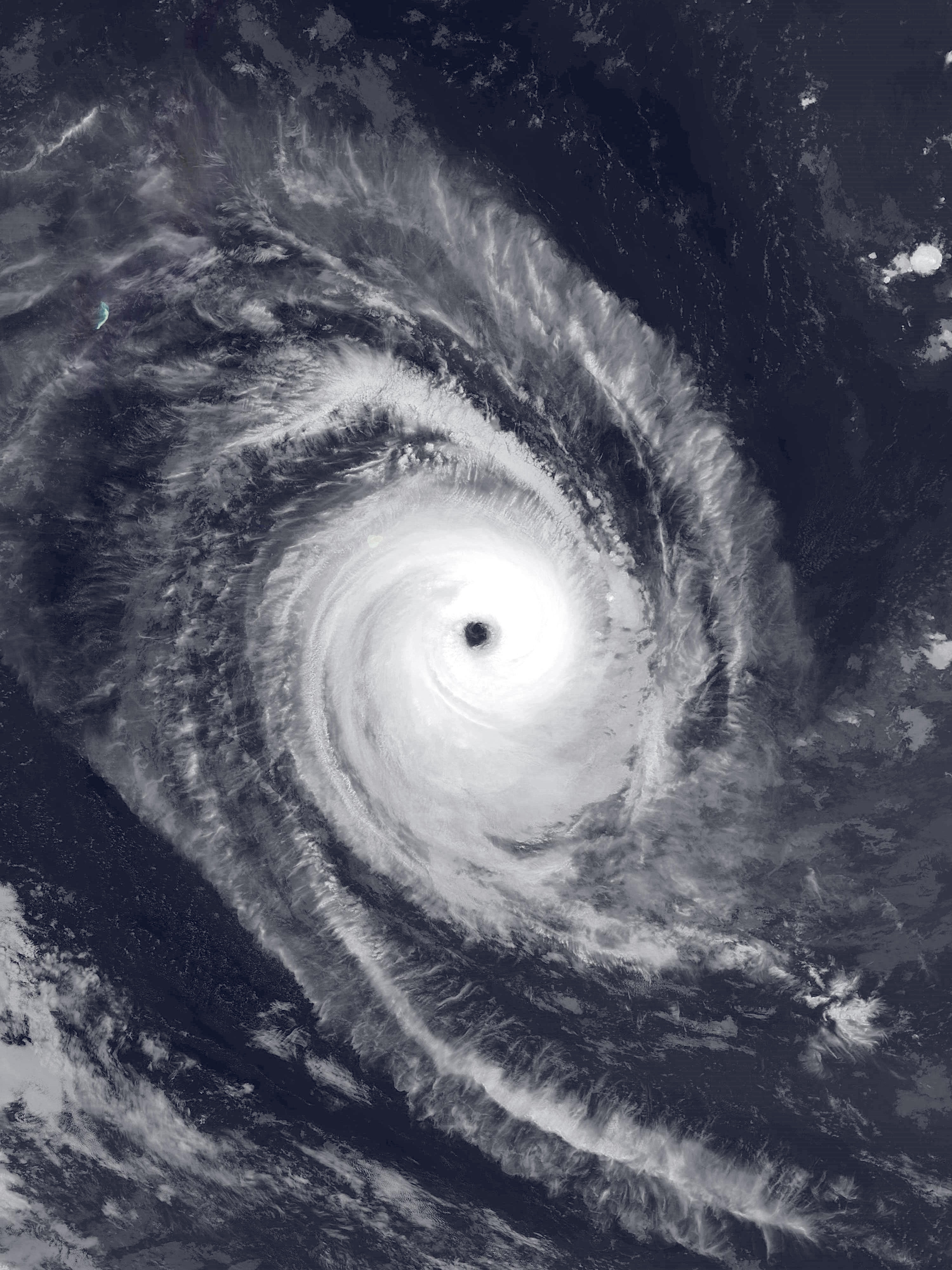
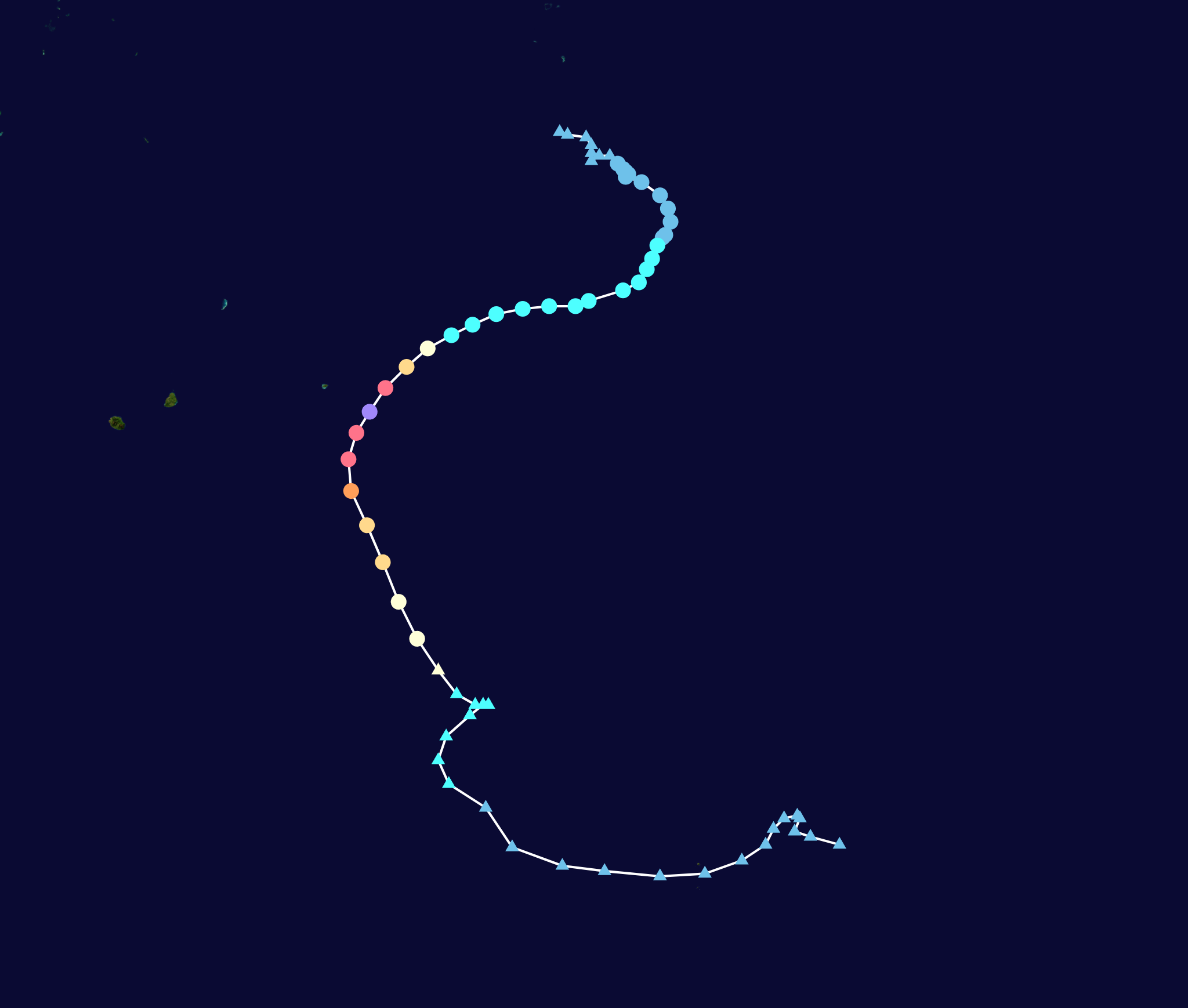
- Duration: 18 February – 25 February
- Peak intensity: 215 km/h (130 mph) (10-min); 947 hPa (mbar)

On 19 February, a low-pressure system that formed in the middle of the Southern Indian Ocean consolidated into a tropical depression; being assigned 22S by the JTWC. After some gradual organization on 20 February, the depression strengthened and it was named Horacio. It initially struggled to strengthen despite existing in a favourable environment, but the storm began strengthening on 21 February into the following day. On 23 February, Horacio reached its peak intensity as a Category 5 tropical cyclone on the Saffir-Simpson scale (SSHWS), becoming the first tropical cyclone of that intensity of the year, the first to do so in the South-West Indian Ocean basin since Djoungou of the 2023-24 season, and the first in the Southern Hemisphere since Errol achieved that status off the coast of northwestern Australia in April 2025. This was then followed by a rapid weakening trend; Horacio quickly lost its Category 5 status. The storm would continue to unravel as it dove southward, ultimately losing tropical cyclone status on 25 February. The system continued in the same general direction, weakening and eventually transitioning into an extratropical low.

=== Tropical Depression 12 ===
- Tropical depression (MFR)
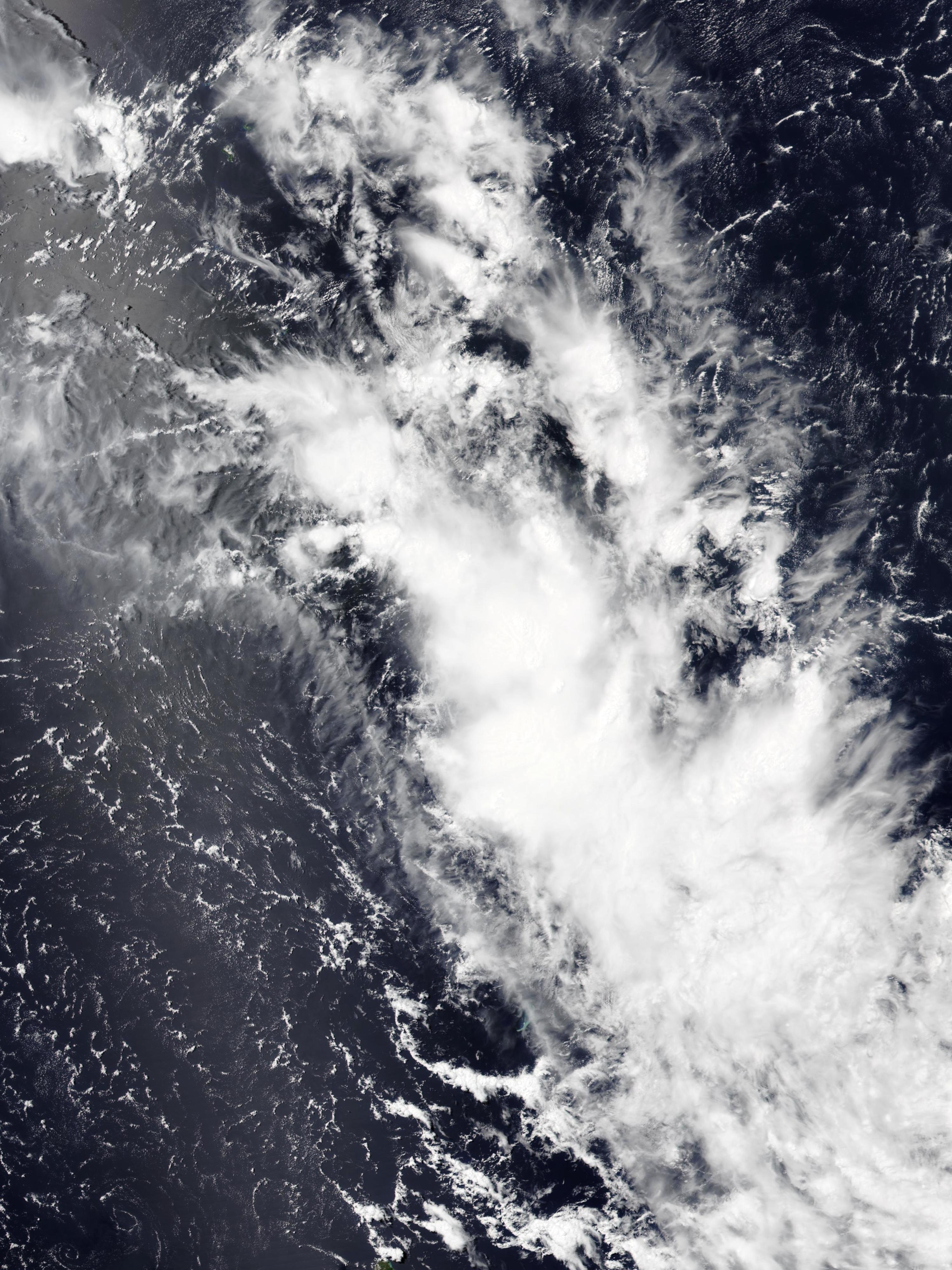
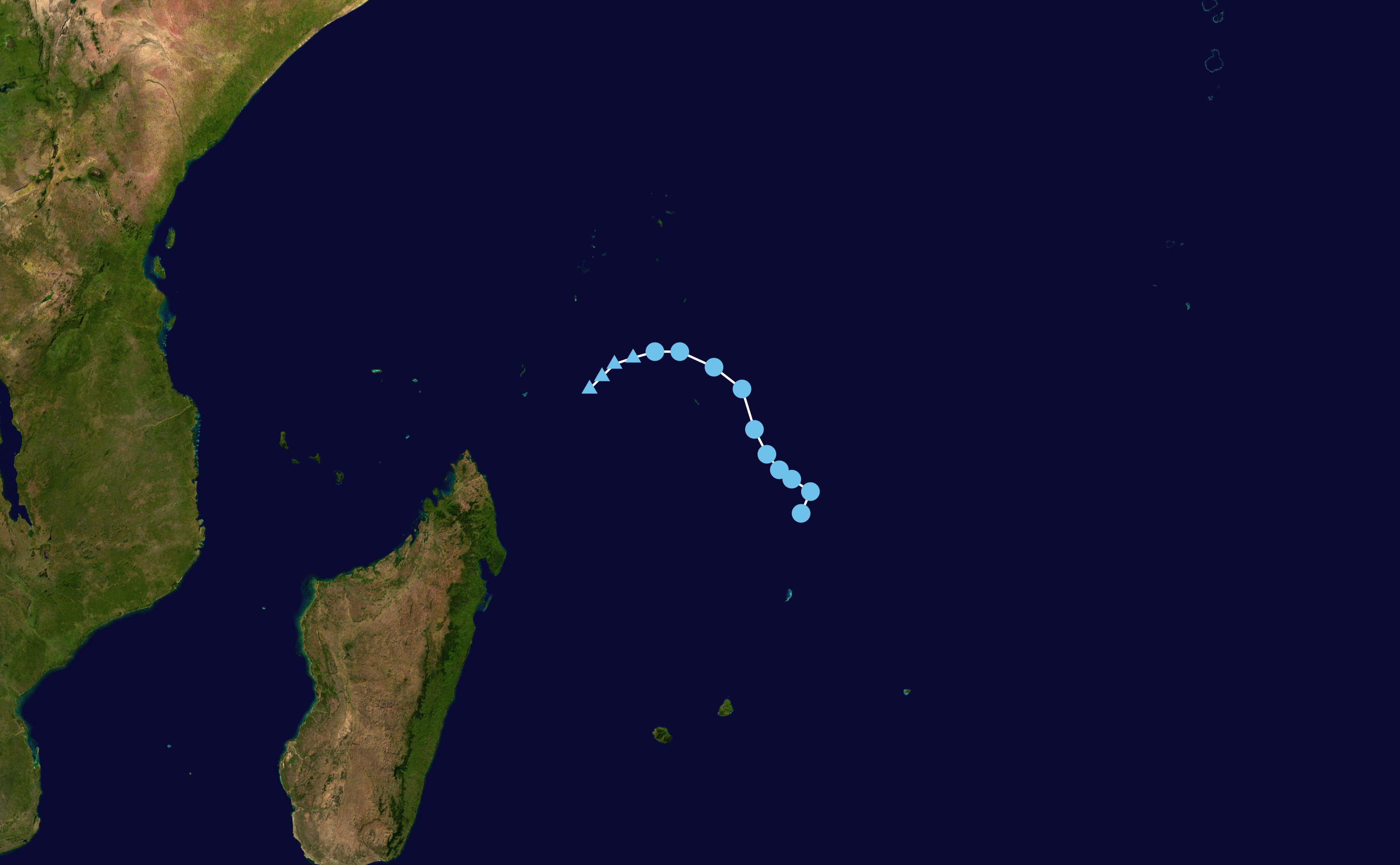
- Duration: 13 March – 14 March
- Peak intensity: 55 km/h (35 mph) (10-min); 1002 hPa (mbar)

On 13 March, Météo-France (MFR) began issuing bulletins on a disturbance about halfway between the Seychelles and Agaléga. The system was designated Zone of Disturbed Weather 12, and intensified into a tropical depression at 00 UTC on the 14 of March. However, 6 hours later, the system's overall structure began to degrade, and MFR stopped issuing bulletins on the system, and closely monitored for re-development. However, no such redevelopment occurred, and both the JTWC and MFR stopped tracking the system. The remnant of the system brought heavy downpours and thunderstorms, leaving significant local rainfall on the Agalega archipelago, the southern islands of the Seychelles, and Rodrigues. On Rodrigues, between 80 and 140 mm of rain fell in less than 24 hours, flooding homes, cutting off roads, trapping vehicles, and even affecting the hospital. Air Mauritius was forced to cancel inter-island flights, and the Rodrigues Emergency Operations Command activated alert level 3 as calls for help were received at several police stations across the island, including reports from elderly people being rescued from the floods. The rains also caused soil erosion, with tons of fertile topsoil washed away into rivers flowing into the lagoon and the coral reef. All schools were closed.

=== Tropical Cyclone Indusa ===
- Tropical cyclone (MFR)
- Category 2 tropical cyclone (SSHWS)
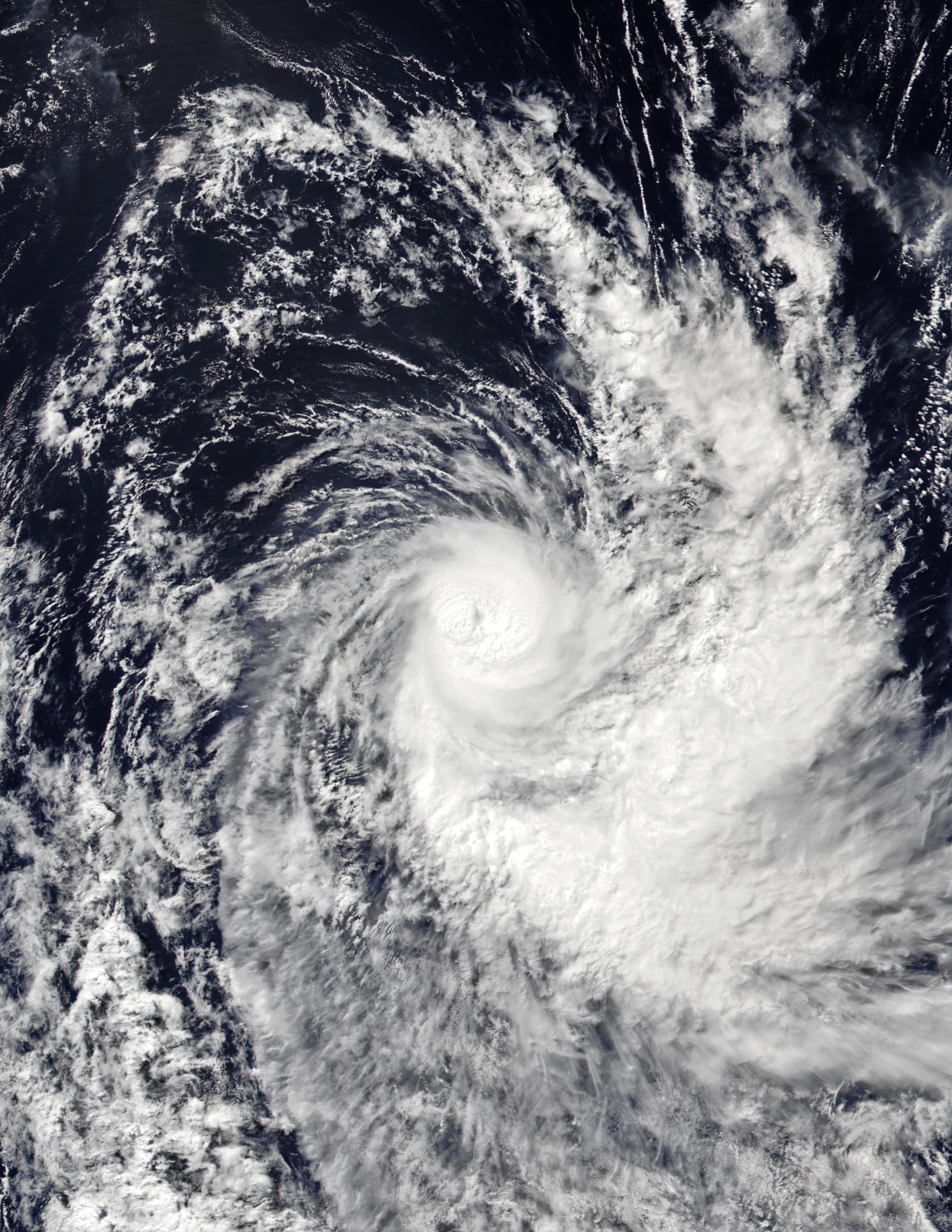
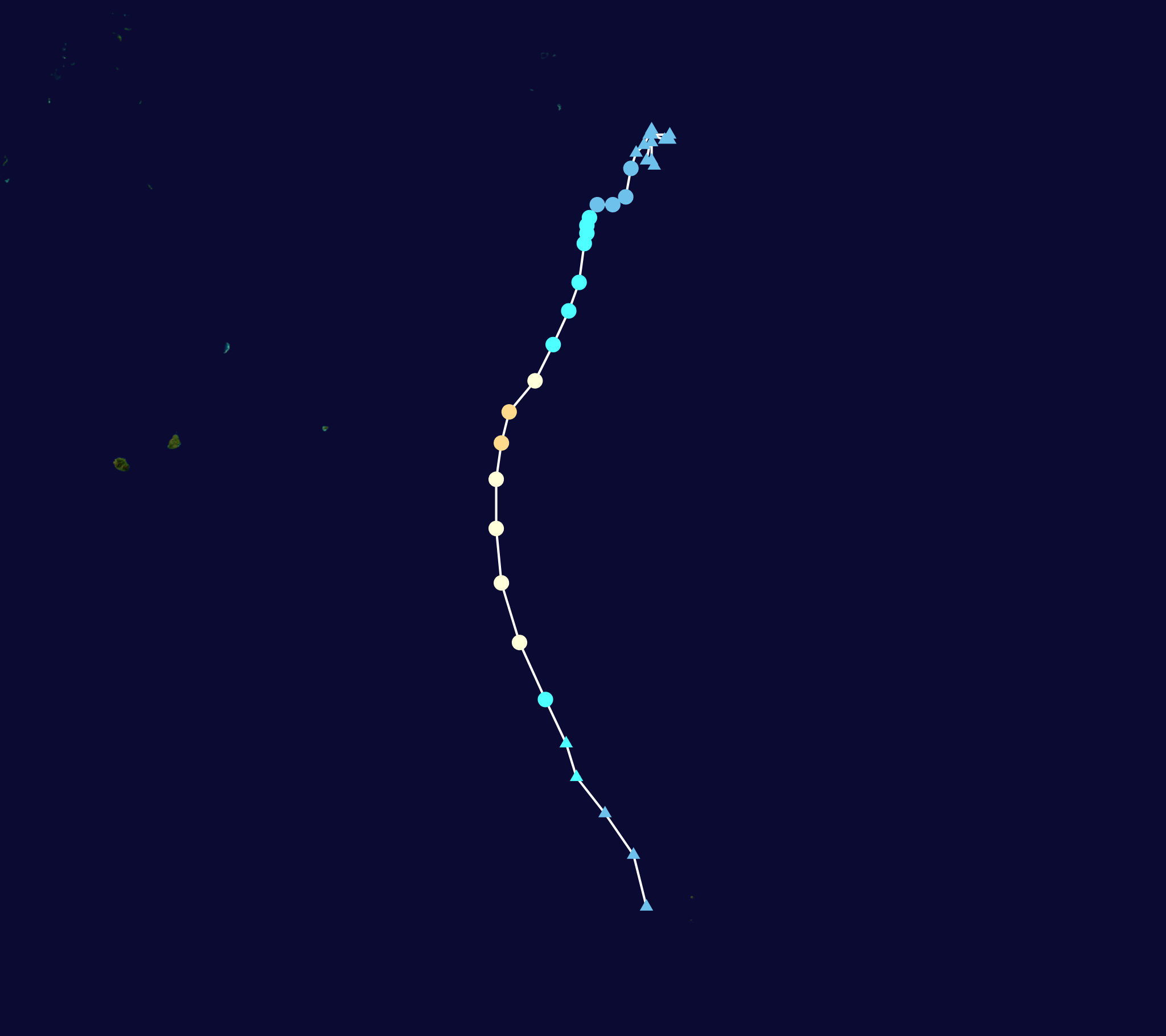
- Duration: 1 April – 5 April
- Peak intensity: 140 km/h (85 mph) (10-min); 975 hPa (mbar)

On 1 April at 12:00 UTC, Météo-France initiated bulletins on Tropical Disturbance 13, located in the open Indian Ocean, far from any landmasses. The Joint Typhoon Warning Center had marked this system as Invest 99S a couple days prior, and by 1 April, they had given the system a moderate chance of development in the next 24 hours. Six hours later, it was upgraded to tropical depression. The next morning, the JTWC upgraded the system to Tropical Storm 29S and MFR classified it as Moderate Tropical Storm Indusa. Thereafter, the storm began to quickly intensify, reaching tropical cyclone strength late on 3 April. The next day, it attained a peak intensity of 130 km/h (80 mph) (over 10 minutes) and a minimum pressure of 972 millibars. During the afternoon on 5 April, Indusa transitioned into a post-tropical cyclone.

=== Subtropical Storm Juluka ===
- Subtropical storm (MFR)
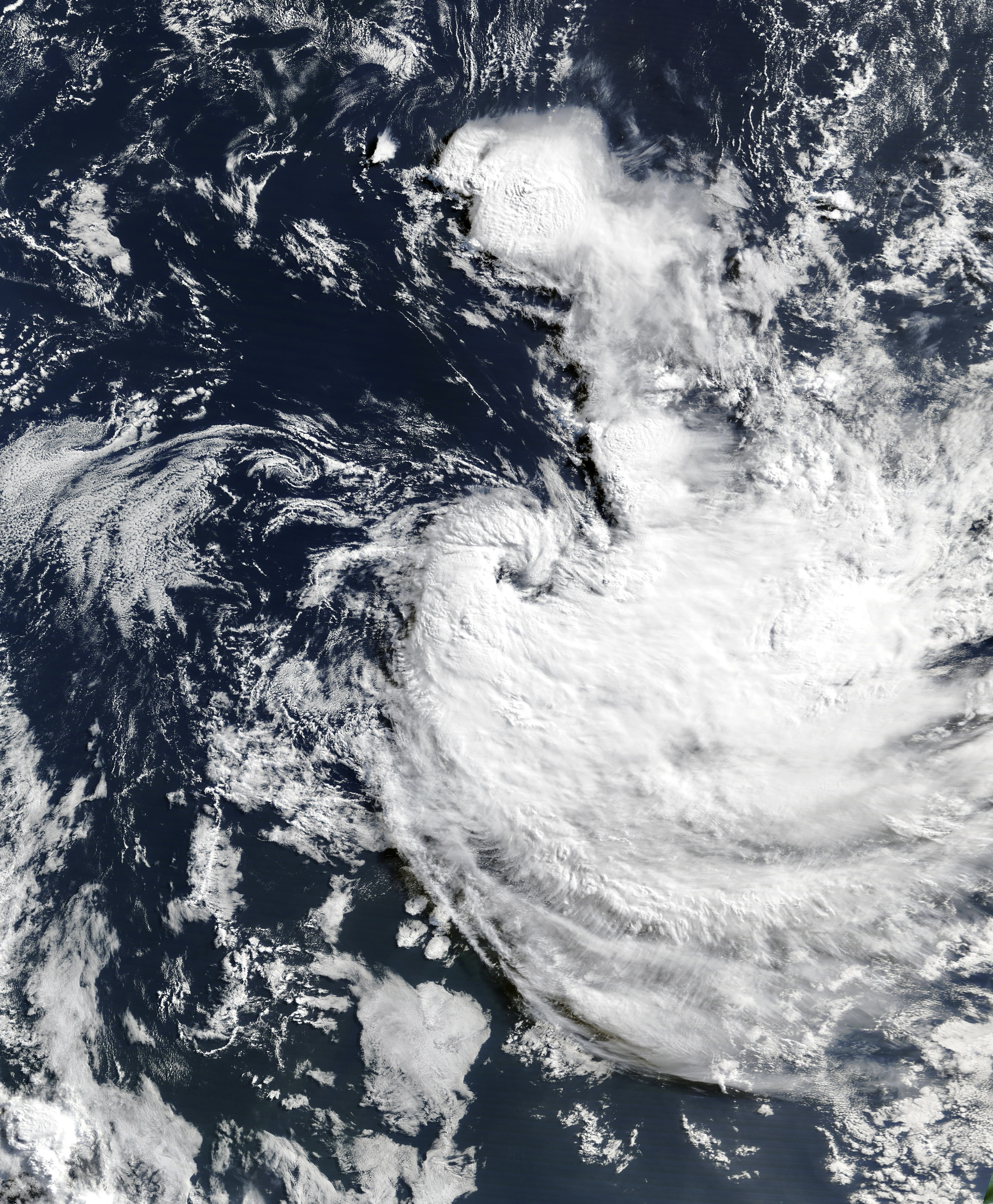
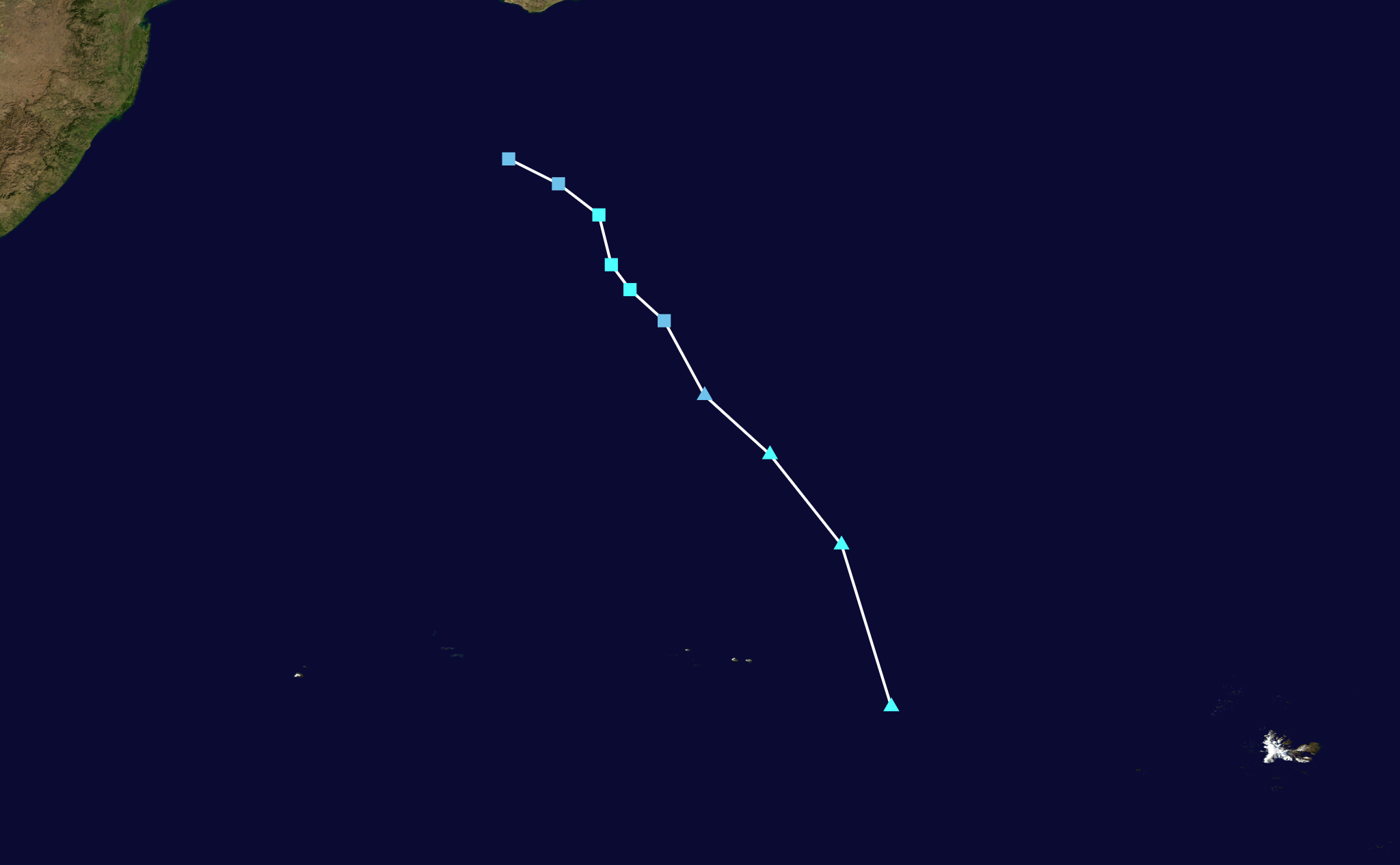
- Duration: 26 April – 28 April
- Peak intensity: 75 km/h (45 mph) (10-min); 1000 hPa (mbar)

On 26 April, a subtropical depression formed several hundred kilometers to the south of Madagascar, the depression consisted of a warm core within a baroclinic zone. The next day, the system increased in organization as an 04:45 UTC ASCAT pass observed winds of 40 kt (45 mph), and was subsequently named Subtropical Storm Juluka by Météo France. The system was poorly organized under an environment of high vertical wind shear despite being embedded under an upper-level trough. On 28 April, Juluka underwent extratropical transition, and ultimately dissipated later that day as it was absorbed into another extratropical cyclone.

=== Other systems ===
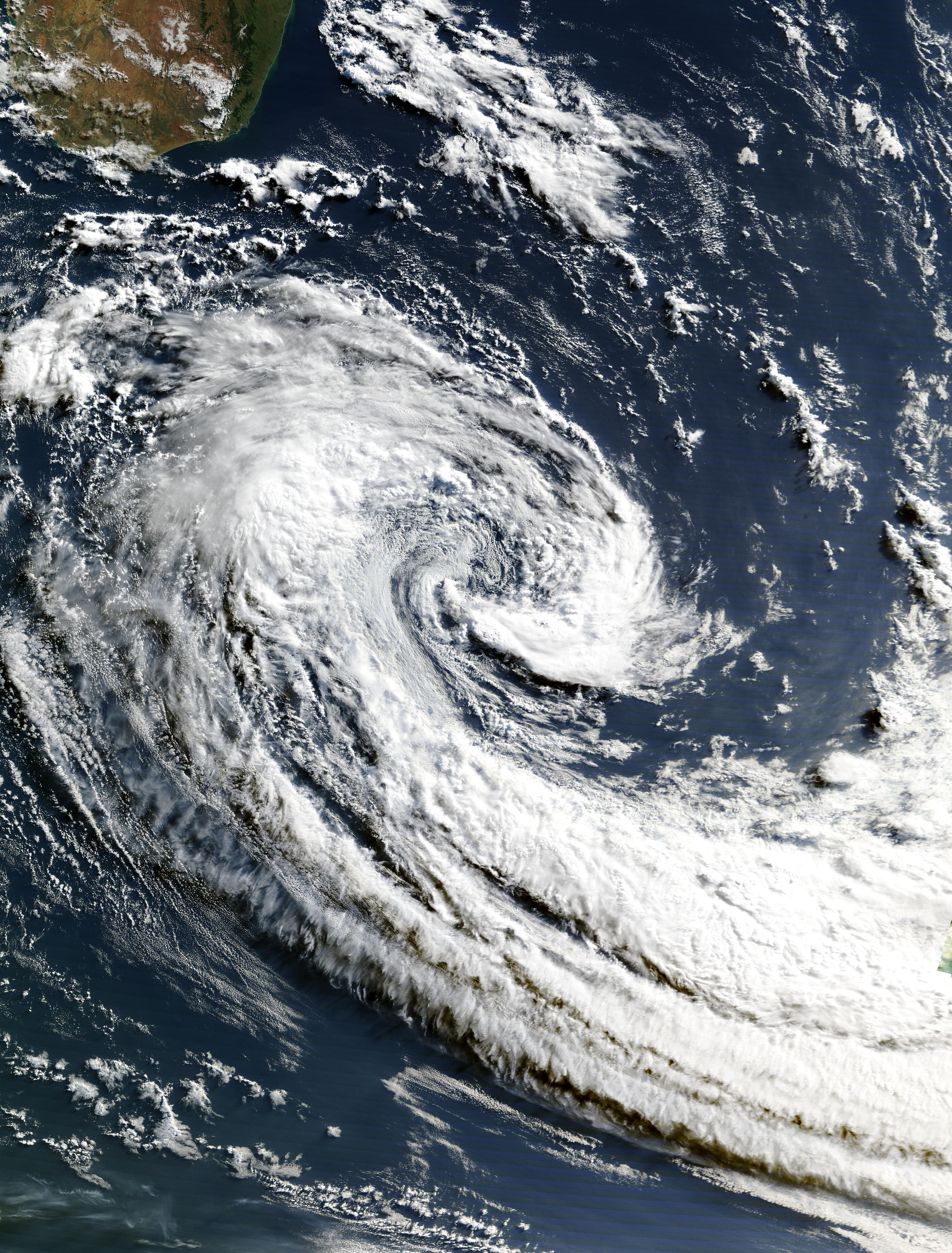
An unnumbered subtropical depression on 11 June

- Cyclone Jenna crossed into the basin from the Australian region on 8 January as a residual depression, according to MFR. The Joint Typhoon Warning Center tracked the system as a tropical storm by their analysis for a short time after its crossover. However, it weakened quickly and was downgraded to a remnant low on the same day. MFR did not issue specific bulletins for the system.
- On 27 January, Météo-France (MFR) began monitoring a broad area of low pressure situated to the east of Madagascar, designating it as Zone of Disturbed Weather 08. The disturbance brought increased cloudiness and scattered squalls to parts of Madagascar and the Mascarenes as it continued to be monitored for further organisation. It dissipated over the water on 28 January, merging with a monsoon trough.
- On 9 June, a low-pressure system developed off a baroclinic zone south of Madagascar within a deep upper level trough. The next day, The Joint Typhoon Warning Center marked the low as Invest 95S, observing that the low had organized into a subtropical depression, and later upgraded it to a subtropical storm. MFR followed suit a day later, upgrading it to a subtropical depression as the system symmetrized, albeit it consisted of shallow convective organization. Later that day, MFR stopped tracking the system, without ever naming or indexing it, citing that the risk of the system becoming a subtropical storm has ceased.

== Storm names ==
Within the South-West Indian Ocean, tropical depressions and subtropical depressions that are judged to have 10-minute sustained windspeeds of 65 km/h (40 mph) by the Regional Specialized Meteorological Centre on Réunion island, France (RSMC La Réunion) are usually assigned a name. However, it is the Sub-Regional Tropical Cyclone Advisory Centres in Mauritius and Madagascar who name the systems. The Sub-Regional Tropical Cyclone Advisory Centre (Mauritius Meteorological Services) in Mauritius names a storm if it intensifies into a moderate tropical storm between 55°E and 90°E. If instead a cyclone intensifies into a moderate tropical storm between 30°E and 55°E then the Sub-Regional Tropical Cyclone Advisory Centre (Meteo Madagascar) in Madagascar assigns the appropriate name to the storm. Storm names are taken from three pre-determined lists of names, which rotate on a triennial basis, with any names that have been used automatically removed. New names this season are: Awo, Blossom, Chenge, Dudzai, Ewetse, and Fytia, which replaced Ashley, Balita, Cheneso, Dingani, Enala, and Fabien during the 2022–23 season.

- Awo
- Blossom
- Chenge
- Dudzai
- Ewetse
- Fytia
- Gezani
- Horacio
- Indusa
- Juluka
- Kundai (unused)
- Lisebo (unused)
- Michel (unused)
- Nousra (unused)
- Olivier (unused)
- Pokera (unused)
- Quincy (unused)
- Rebaone (unused)
- Salama (unused)
- Tristan (unused)
- Ursula (unused)
- Violet (unused)
- Wilson (unused)
- Xila (unused)
- Yekela (unused)
- Zaina (unused)

If a tropical cyclone crosses 90°E into the South-West Indian basin from the Australian region basin, it will retain the name assigned to it by the Australian Bureau of Meteorology (BoM). The following storms were named in this manner.

- Grant

== Season effects ==
This table lists all of the tropical cyclones and subtropical cyclones that were monitored during the 2025–2026 South-West Indian Ocean cyclone season. Information on their intensity, duration, name, areas affected, primarily comes from RSMC La Réunion. Death and damage reports come from either press reports or the relevant national disaster management agency while the damage totals are given in 2025 or 2026 USD.

Name	Dates	Peak intensity			Areas affected	Damage (USD)	Deaths	Ref(s).
Name	Dates	Category	Wind speed	Pressure	Areas affected	Damage (USD)	Deaths	Ref(s).
01	16–18 July	Tropical depression	55 km/h (35 mph)	1000 hPa (29.53 inHg)	None	None	None	
Awo	6–8 August	Moderate tropical storm	75 km/h (45 mph)	1000 hPa (29.53 inHg)	Agaléga	None	None	
Blossom	9–12 September	Moderate tropical storm	65 km/h (40 mph)	1003 hPa (29.62 inHg)	None	None	None	
Chenge	17–25 October	Severe tropical storm	95 km/h (60 mph)	985 hPa (29.09 inHg)	Chagos Archipelago, Agaléga, Seychelles, Tanzania, Kenya	Unknown	None	
Grant	27 December–6 January	Intense tropical cyclone	205 km/h (125 mph)	940 hPa (27.76 inHg)	St. Brandon, Tromelin Island, Madagascar (After crossover)	Unknown	None	
Dudzai	10–21 January	Intense tropical cyclone	205 km/h (125 mph)	937 hPa (27.67 inHg)	Mascarene Islands	None	None	
Ewetse	19–21 January	Severe tropical storm	95 km/h (60 mph)	992 hPa (29.29 inHg)	Mozambique, Madagascar	Unknown	None	
08	27–28 January	Zone of disturbed weather	35 km/h (25 mph)	1009 hPa (29.80 inHg)	Madagascar, Mascarene Islands	Unknown	None	
Fytia	29 January–4 February	Tropical cyclone	155 km/h (100 mph)	960 hPa (28.35 inHg)	Mozambique, Comoros, Mayotte, Juan de Nova Island, Madagascar, Mascarene Islands	$475 million	12	
Gezani	4–18 February	Intense tropical cyclone	195 km/h (120 mph)	952 hPa (28.11 inHg)	St. Brandon, Mascarene Islands, Madagascar, Juan de Nova Island, Europa Island, Mozambique, Crozet Islands, Kerguelen Islands, Heard Island and McDonald Islands	$2 billion	63+	
Horacio	18–25 February	Intense tropical cyclone	215 km/h (130 mph)	947 hPa (27.96 inHg)	Chagos Archipelago, Rodrigues, Saint Paul and Amsterdam Islands	None	None	
12	13–14 March	Tropical depression	55 km/h (35 mph)	1002 hPa (29.59 inHg)	Seychelles, Agaléga, Rodrigues	Unknown	None	
Indusa	1–5 April	Tropical cyclone	140 km/h (85 mph)	975 hPa (28.79 inHg)	Chagos Archipelago	None	None	
Juluka	26–28 April	Subtropical storm	75 km/h (45 mph)	1000 hPa (29.53 inHg)	None	None	None	
Season aggregates
14 systems	16 July 2025 – 11 June 2026		215 km/h (130 mph)	937 hPa (27.67 inHg)		>$2.48 billion	75+	

== See also ==
- Weather of 2025 and 2026
- List of Southern Hemisphere cyclone seasons
- Tropical cyclones in 2025 and 2026
- Atlantic hurricane seasons: 2025, 2026
- Pacific hurricane seasons: 2025, 2026
- Pacific typhoon seasons: 2025, 2026
- North Indian Ocean cyclone seasons: 2025, 2026
- 2025–26 Australian region cyclone season
- 2025–26 South Pacific cyclone season
