= RSMC La Réunion =

Regional Specialized Meteorological Centre for Tropical Cyclones of La Réunion
- Abbreviation: RSMC La Réunion
- Established: 1 July 1993 (32 years ago)
- Types: meteorological service
- Legal status: Établissement public à caractère administratif
- Headquarters: Saint-Denis
- Location: Réunion
- Country: France
- Coordinates: 20°53′48″S 55°29′42″E
- Parent organisations: Météo-France
- Affiliations: Laboratoire de l'Atmosphère et des Cyclones
- Website: www.meteo.fr/temps/domtom/La_Reunion/webcmrs9.0/

The Regional Specialized Meteorological Centre for Tropical Cyclones of La Réunion (RSMC La Réunion) is a Regional Specialized Meteorological Centre of the World Meteorological Organization (WMO) located on the island of La Réunion, a French overseas department off the coast of East Africa. Under the responsibility of Météo-France, it is responsible for monitoring tropical cyclones in the central and southwestern Indian Ocean between the Chagos Archipelago and southern Madagascar.

== History ==
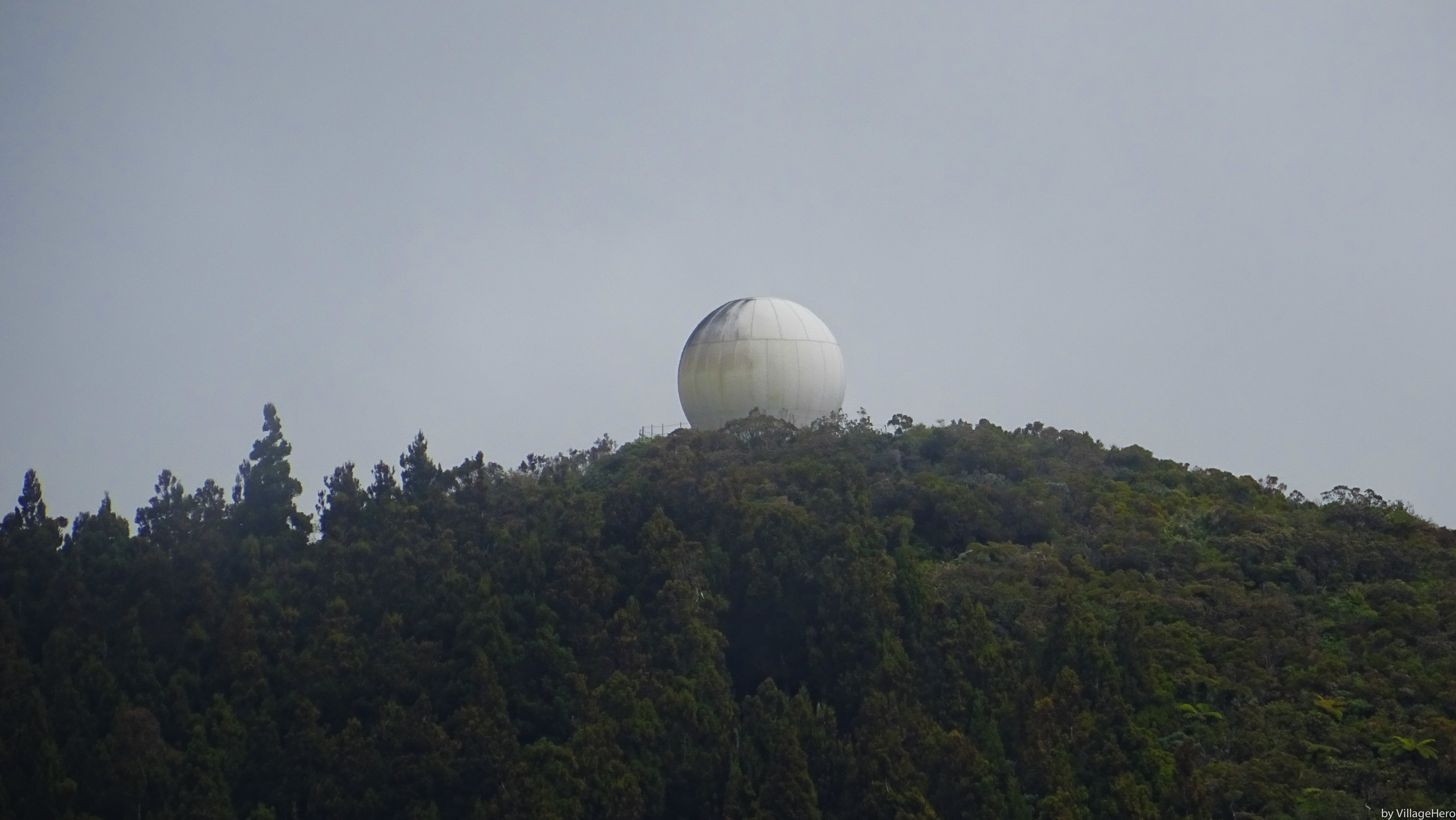
Weather radar on Piton de Villers covering the South of La Réunion.

In 1986, an Australian expert consultant for the WMO Secretariat, was commissioned to prepare a project proposal for the establishment of a regional centre which was submitted the following year to the Tropical Cyclone Committee (TCC) held in Antananarivo (Madagascar). The report recommended the establishment of a Regional Specialized Meteorological Centre (RSMC) in Saint-Denis, Réunion, and two sub-regional centres in Mauritius (Vacoas) and Madagascar (Antananarivo).

In 1988, France formally committed to fulfilling and implementing the 25 obligations required for the creation of a RSMC and in 1989, at its 9th session held in Harare (Zimbabwe), the Tropical Cyclone Committee decided to establish a Regional Tropical Cyclone Advisory Centre (RTAC) as suggested, but this decision was not recognized by the WMO regional body for Africa, as it had not been ratified by the WMO Commission for Basic Systems (CBS).

In December 1990, at its 10th session held in Bamako, the Regional Association officially proposed that Saint-Denis, La Réunion, be designated to host the future RSMC, subject to the Centre in La Réunion first demonstrating its capabilities. In 1991, a group of experts evaluated the performance of the future centre and in July 1992, in its detailed report, it judged that the Centre of La Réunion was suitable for designation as CMRS.

In November 1992, during the 10th session of the CBS (Commission for Basic Systems of the WMO) in Geneva, the conclusions of this report were validated and it recommended that the Regional Tropical Cyclone Warning Centre of La Réunion be officially designated as a RSMC specialising in tropical cyclones for the South-West Indian Ocean. The following June, the Executive Council of the World Meteorological Organisation endorsed this proposal, effective 1 July 1993.

Since 1998, the Cyclone Research Unit (CRC) has been working on adapting numerical weather prediction models to cyclonic phenomena. In 2006, the CRC joined the “Atmosphere and Cyclones Laboratory” with the French National Centre for Scientific Research (CNRS), the University of Reunion Island and Météo-France.

== Area of responsibility ==
The official area of responsibility of RSMC La Réunion covers the tropical and subtropical waters of the Southwest Indian Ocean. The area initially covered from 5°S to 30°S, from 90°E to Africa (30°E), including the Mozambique Channel. In 2003, it was extended to extend from the equator to 40° South latitude.

== Mission ==
The mission of the RSMC is to monitor tropical cyclones in the designated ocean basin, to develop and disseminate information on these systems, and to warn populations and maritime or air interests of their approach. This information, including analyses and forecasts, is contained in different bulletins:

- Once a day throughout the year: issue a bulletin monitoring meteorological activity in the tropical domain (ITCZ) which includes a reasoned analysis of the meteorological situation, its expected evolution and the risk of formation of a tropical depression (tropical cyclogenesis) over the next five days.
- In the event of current cyclonic activity in the basin: issue different types of bulletins from 1 to 4 times a day, as needed, at the so-called "synoptic" times at 00, 06, 12 and 18 hours UTC for maritime and public users.

The CMRS also provides this data to the 15 member countries of the zone (South Africa, Botswana, Comoros, France, Kenya, Lesotho, Madagascar, Malawi, Mauritius, Mozambique, Namibia, Seychelles, Swaziland, Tanzania, Zimbabwe). Finally, the CMRS also has a training and research role.
