= List of storms named Fernand =

The name Fernand has been used for three tropical cyclones in the Atlantic Ocean.

- Tropical Storm Fernand (2013), short-lived tropical storm that formed in the Gulf of Mexico and struck Veracruz, Mexico
- Tropical Storm Fernand (2019), another short-lived Gulf of Mexico tropical storm that made landfall over northeastern Mexico
- Tropical Storm Fernand (2025), remained over the open ocean

== See also ==
- Tropical Storm Fernando (2017) – a moderate tropical storm in the South-West Indian Ocean with a similar name
