= Tropical Storm Fernand (2019) =

Atlantic tropical storm

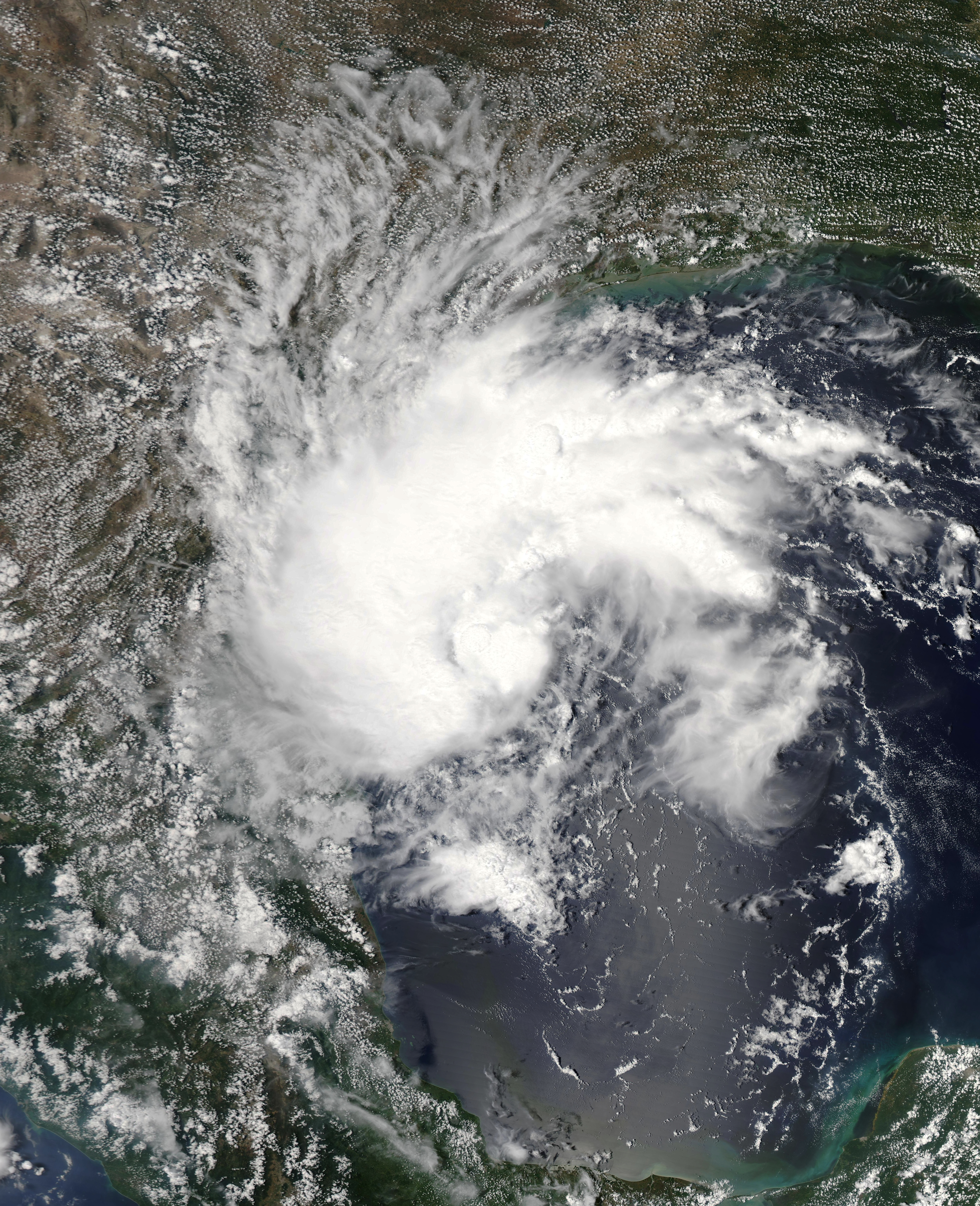
- Tropical Storm Fernand off the coast of Tamaulipas on September 3

Meteorological history
- Formed: September 3, 2019
- Dissipated: September 5, 2019

Tropical storm
- 1-minute sustained (SSHWS/NWS)
- Highest winds: 50 mph (85 km/h)
- Lowest pressure: 1000 mbar (hPa); 29.53 inHg

Overall effects
- Fatalities: 1 total
- Damage: $43.7 million (2019 USD)
- Areas affected: Northern Mexico, South Texas
- IBTrACS
- Part of the 2019 Atlantic hurricane season

Tropical Storm Fernand was a short-lived tropical cyclone that caused severe flooding in northern Mexico in early September 2019. The sixth named storm of the 2019 Atlantic hurricane season, Fernand developed from a broad area of low pressure that was first monitored in the southeastern Gulf of Mexico on August 31. Gradual organization ensued as the low moved westward, and it developed into a tropical depression early on September 3. The cyclone quickly strengthened into Tropical Storm Fernand six hours after formation, and attained peak winds of 50 mph (80 km/h) early on September 4. However, easterly wind shear and the cyclone's close proximity to the Mexican coast prevented further development, and Fernand weakened slightly before making landfall along the coast of northeastern Mexico at 15:15 UTC September 4. Fernand quickly weakened to a tropical depression as it moved over the Sierra Madre Oriental, and by 03:00 UTC on September 5, the cyclone had dissipated over the rugged terrain of Mexico. Fernand caused torrential, much-needed rainfall in Monterrey and other communities.

== Meteorological history ==
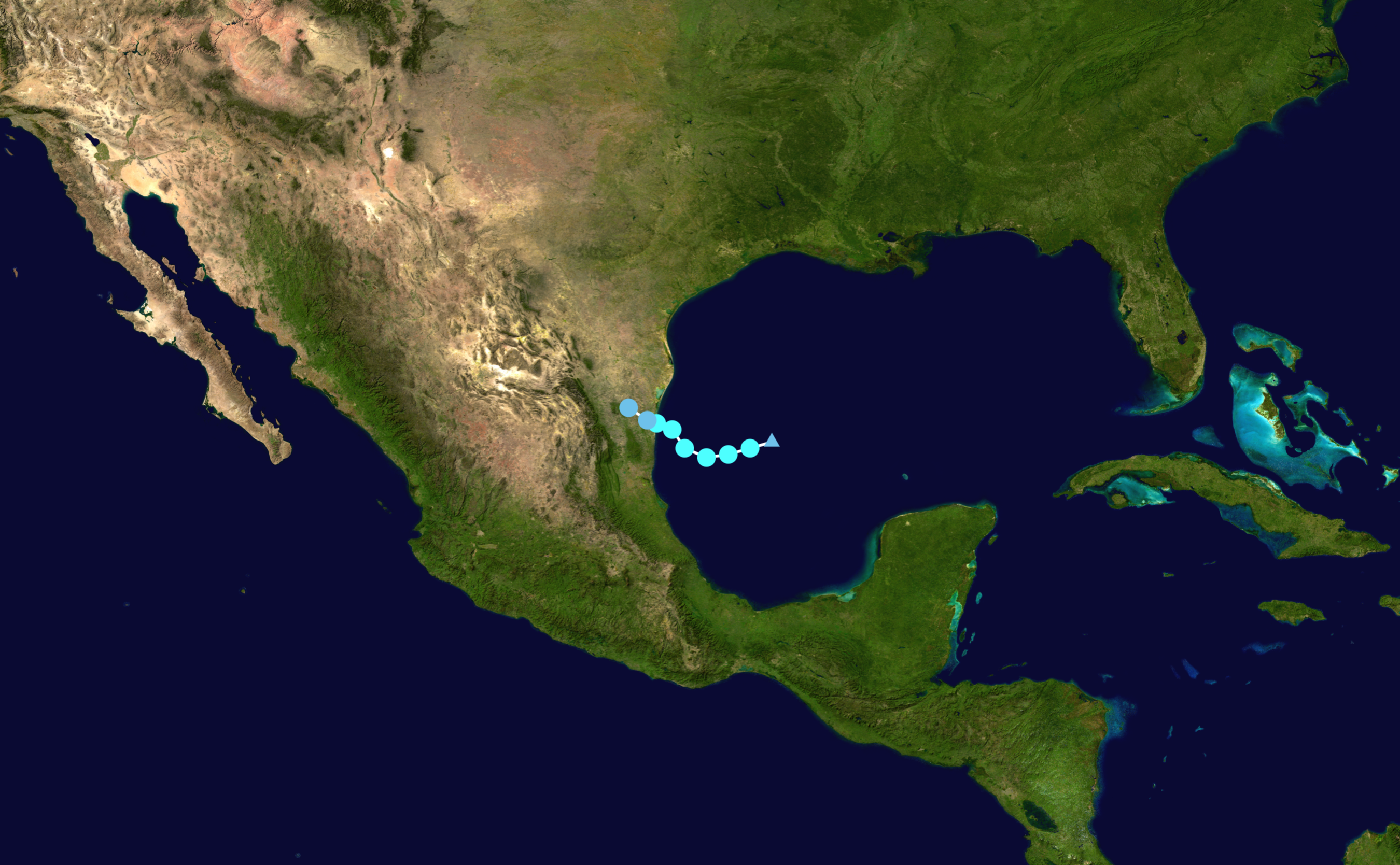
Map plotting the storm's track and intensity, according to the Saffir–Simpson scale Map key Saffir–Simpson scale Tropical depression (≤38 mph, ≤62 km/h) Tropical storm (39–73 mph, 63–118 km/h) Category 1 (74–95 mph, 119–153 km/h) Category 2 (96–110 mph, 154–177 km/h) Category 3 (111–129 mph, 178–208 km/h) Category 4 (130–156 mph, 209–251 km/h) Category 5 (≥157 mph, ≥252 km/h) Unknown Storm type Tropical cyclone Subtropical cyclone Extratropical cyclone, remnant low, tropical disturbance, or monsoon depression

Early on August 31, 2019, the National Hurricane Center (NHC) began monitoring a broad area of low pressure located over the southeastern Gulf of Mexico for tropical cyclogenesis. Slow, but steady development occurred as the low moved generally westward across the southern Gulf of Mexico. On September 2, shower and thunderstorm activity associated with the low became more concentrated, and the surface circulation became better defined. Although the disturbance still lacked a well-defined center by the following morning, the continued trend of organization and the system's threat to northeastern Mexico resulted in the issuance of advisories on Potential Tropical Cyclone Seven at 09:00 UTC September 3. Shortly thereafter, first-light visible satellite images indicated the presence of a well-defined center of circulation, signifying the formation of a tropical depression at 15:00 UTC. The cyclone continued to become better organized, and scatterometer data from 16:00 UTC that day revealed an area of tropical storm-force winds to the west of the center. Based on this data, the NHC upgraded the depression to Tropical Storm Fernand at 18:00 UTC on September 3.

Fernand continued to quickly strengthen as it moved westward, and by 03:00 UTC on September 4, it attained its peak intensity with maximum sustained winds of 50 mph (80 km/h), as evidenced by an NOAA Hurricane hunter aircraft investigating the system. Although the cyclone was forecast to strengthen further before reaching the Mexican coast, the effects of moderate easterly to southeasterly wind shear and the entrainment of dry air into the storm's circulation prevented further intensification. By mid-day on September 4, much of the associated convection had moved inland over Mexico, and Fernand weakened slightly before making landfall on the northeastern coast of Mexico at around 15:15 UTC about 35 miles (56 km) north of La Pesca with maximum sustained winds of 45 mph (72 km/h). Just hours after moving inland, the surface circulation of Fernand quickly became poorly defined, and the cyclone weakened to a tropical depression at 21:00 UTC on September 4. Weakening continued as Fernand moved further inland, and at 03:00 UTC on September 5, the cyclone dissipated over the very rugged terrain of the Sierra Madre Oriental.

== Preparations and impact ==
=== Mexico ===
Upon the initiation of advisories on Potential Tropical Cyclone Seven early on September 3, the Government of Mexico issued a tropical storm warning for La Pesca northward to Barra El Mezquital in northeastern Mexico. The warning was extended northward to the mouth of the Rio Grande river and southward to Barra del Tordo at 18:00 UTC with the designation of Tropical Storm Fernand. In preparation for the storm, the Mexican government activated Plan DN-III-E, sending 4,000 troops to the northeastern states to assist in disaster relief.

Fernand produced torrential rainfall across much of northeastern Mexico, including the states of Coahuila, Nuevo León, Tamaulipas and San Luis Potosí. In some parts of Nuevo León, six months-worth of rain fell within just six hours, causing rivers and streams to overflow their banks as floodwaters inundated roads, bridges, homes and, buildings. Schools and public transportation lines across the state were closed on September 5, and over 400 schools sustained damages as a result of effects from the storm. In the municipality of García, a Venezuelan man died after he was swept away by floodwaters while trying to clean a sewer; two others who were with him at the time were rescued. In Monterrey, a taxi driver was forced to abandon his vehicle after it sank in rapidly-rising floodwaters. A man in Monterrey who was carried away by floodwaters along the Santa Catarina river was rescued by Civil Protection workers, and sustained no major injuries, while another man and his dog who attempted to drive through floodwaters in La Huasteca also required rescue after being caught in the strong current of the floodwaters. On September 7, Governor of Nuevo León Jaime Rodríguez Calderón declared a state of emergency for Nuevo León, further announcing that he would request funding and resources from the National Disaster Fund to aid in repairs and relief efforts. Initial damage in Nuevo León was estimated to be Mex$7.5 billion (US$383 million). Two months later, the National Civil Protection found that the damage in Nuevo León was just Mex$222 million (US$11.3 million), much less than the initial estimation. The government confirmed the total damage to be Mex$861 million (US$43.7 million).

=== United States ===
Although the center of Fernand remained over northeastern Mexico, the storm's outer rainbands brought much-needed rainfall to portions of drought-stricken South Texas. Rainfall totals of 1.2 in (30 mm) or more were reported in several locations in the state, peaking at 3.7 in (94 mm) in Port Isabel. Cameron County public beach access No. 5 and 6, as well as Boca Chica Beach were temporarily closed on September 3 due to high tides and the risk of rip currents produced by the storm. Scattered storms were seen across the Corpus Christi area in the outer bands.

== See also ==
- Tropical cyclones in 2019
- Other tropical cyclones named Fernand
- Tropical Storm Gabrielle (1995) – Strong tropical storm that caused moderate flooding in northeastern Mexico and South Texas in August 1995.
- Tropical Storm Beryl (2000) – Disorganized tropical cyclone that produced minor flooding in northeastern Mexico in August 2000.
- Tropical Storm Alberto (2024) – Another disorganized but strong tropical storm that caused significant flooding in northeastern Mexico, Texas and Louisiana in June 2024.
