= Tropical cyclones in 2019 =

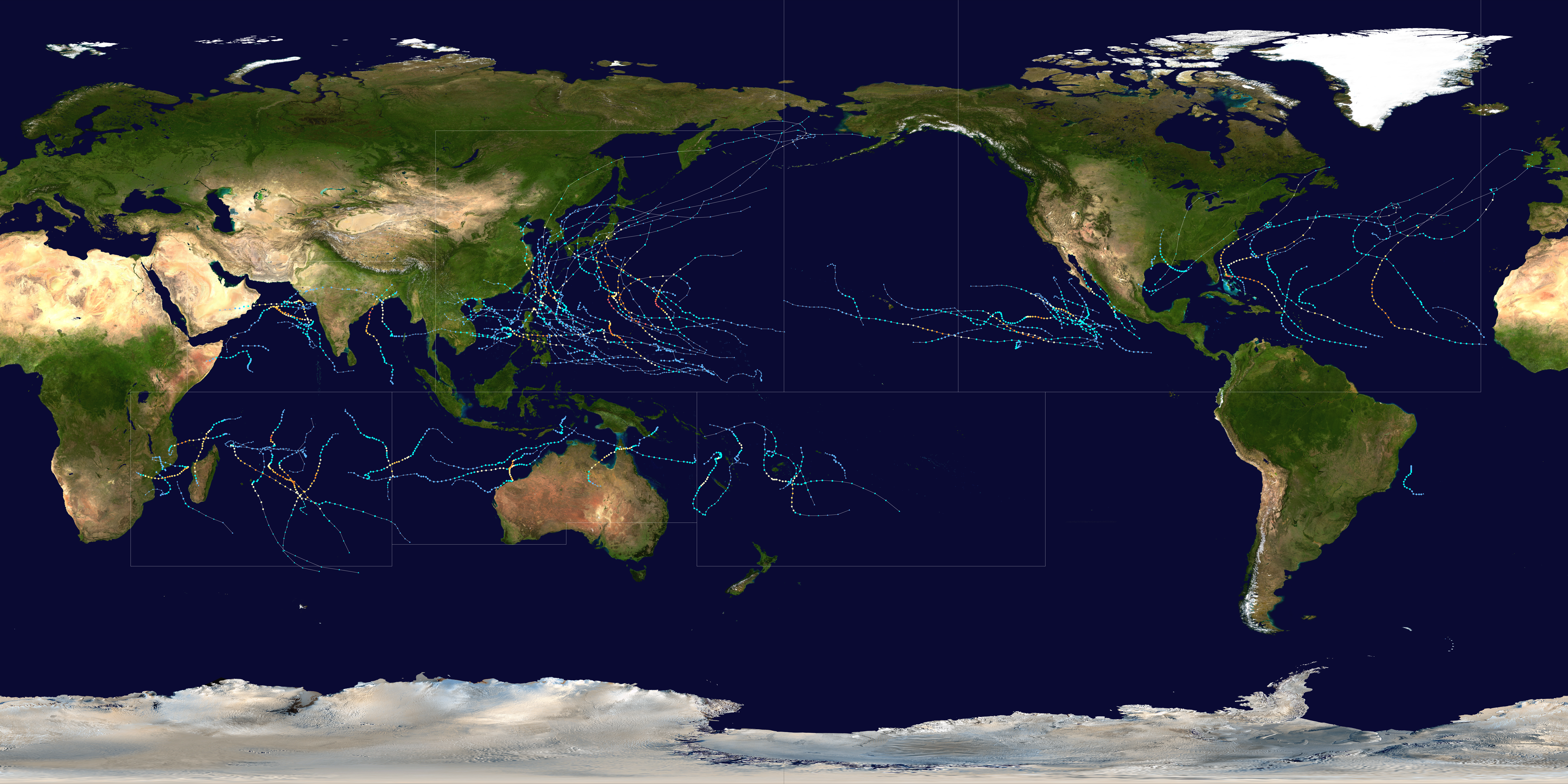
- Year summary map

Year boundaries
- First system: Amang
- Formed: January 4, 2019
- Last system: Sarai
- Dissipated: January 2, 2020

Strongest system
- Name: Halong
- Lowest pressure: 905 mbar (hPa); 26.72 inHg

Longest lasting system
- Name: Oma
- Duration: 15 days

Year statistics
- Total systems: 142
- Named systems: 100
- Total fatalities: 2,500 total
- Total damage: > $67.647 billion (2019 USD)
Related articles
- 2019 Atlantic hurricane season
- 2019 Pacific hurricane season
- 2019 Pacific typhoon season
- 2019 North Indian Ocean cyclone season
- 2018–19 South-West Indian Ocean cyclone season
- 2019–20 South-West Indian Ocean cyclone season
- 2018–19 Australian region cyclone season
- 2019–20 Australian region cyclone season
- 2018–19 South Pacific cyclone season
- 2019–20 South Pacific cyclone season

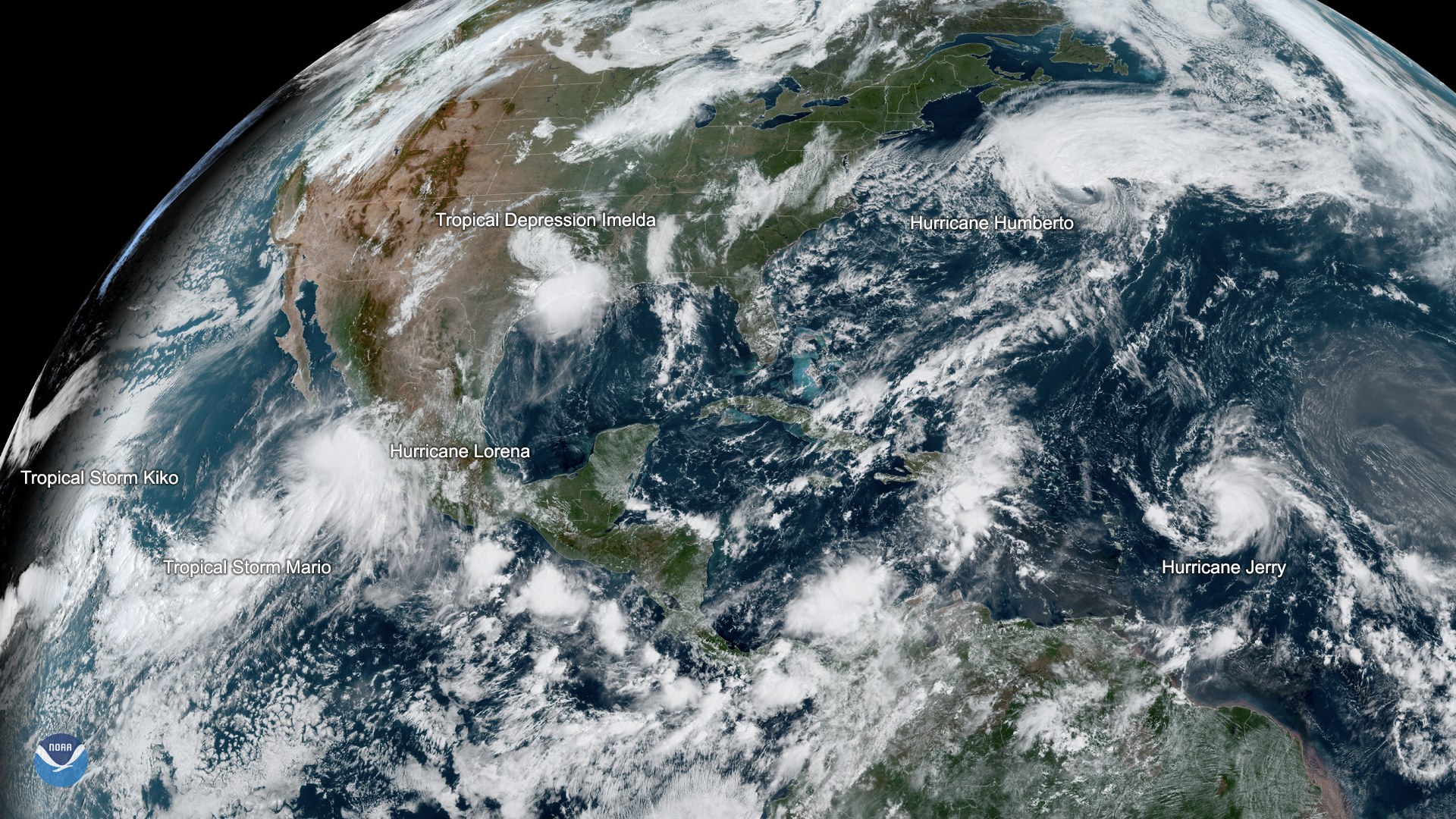
Six simultaneous tropical cyclones in the Eastern Pacific and North Atlantic on September 19. From left to right: Kiko, Mario, Lorena, Imelda, Humberto and Jerry

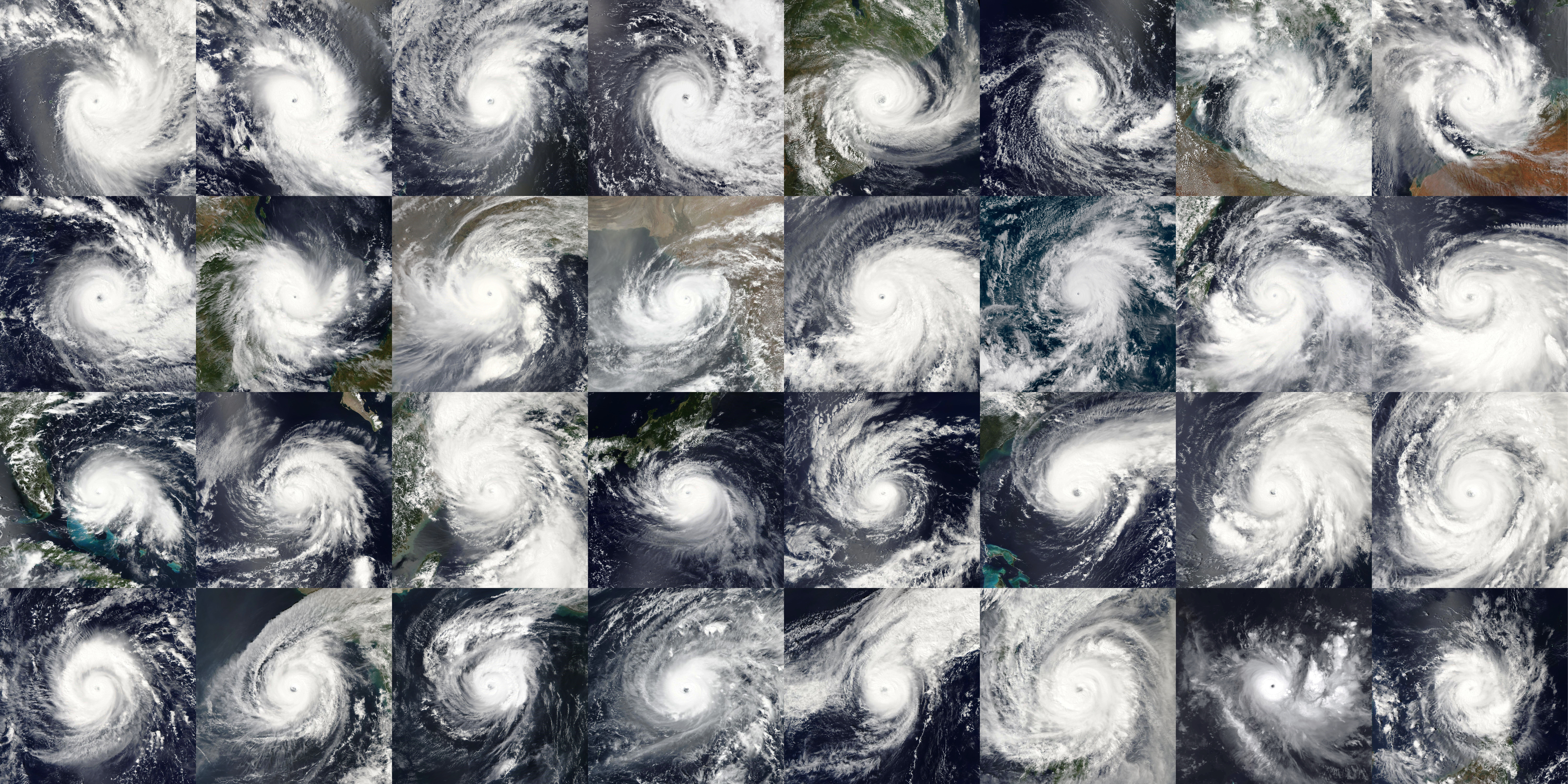
Taken by various of satellites throughout 2019, these are the 33 tropical cyclones that reached at least Category 3 on the Saffir-Simpson scale during that year, from Funani in February to Ambali in December (though Belna is the last image). Among them, Halong (fourth image in the fourth row) was the most intense with a minimum central pressure of 905 hPa.

During 2019, tropical cyclones formed within seven different tropical cyclone basins, located within various parts of the Atlantic, Pacific and Indian Oceans. During the year, a total of 142 systems formed, with 100 of these developing further and being named by the responsible warning centre. The strongest tropical cyclone of the year was Typhoon Halong, with a minimum barometric pressure of 905 hPa (26.72 inHg). Cyclone Idai became the deadliest tropical cyclone of the year, after killing 1,593 people in Mozambique, Malawi, Zimbabwe, and Madagascar. The costliest tropical cyclone of the year was Typhoon Hagibis, which caused more than $15 billion in damage after striking Japan.

Similar to the previous year, 2019 was above average in terms of the number of storms. The most active basin of the year was the Western Pacific, which documented 29 named systems. The Eastern Pacific had an average season, although many of the storms were rather weak and short-lived, therefore the number of hurricanes was the least since 2010. The North Atlantic hurricane season experienced an above average number of tropical storms, numbering 18, though most were rather weak and short-lived, especially late in the season. In the North Indian Ocean basin it was extremely active, breaking many records. This included Cyclone Kyarr, the second-strongest Arabian Sea Cyclone on record and one of the strongest cyclone ever in the North Indian Ocean. Activity across the southern hemisphere's three basins – South-West Indian, Australian, and South Pacific – was fairly significant, with the regions recording 25 named storms altogether, with the most intense Southern Hemisphere cyclone of the year, Cyclone Ambali from the Southwest Indian Ocean basin peaking with a central pressure of 930 hPa (27.46 inHg). Eight Category 5 tropical cyclones formed in 2019. The accumulated cyclone energy (ACE) index for the 2019 (seven basins combined), as calculated by Colorado State University (CSU) was 854.8 units.

== Global atmospheric and hydrological conditions ==
The El Niño from the previous year continued into the start of 2019, albeit in borderline-neutral conditions, though many agencies were still predicting it to continue into Spring. This weak El Niño state persisted through Summer, however sea surface temperatures in the Pacific transitioned to a neutral state by August, marking the end of the El Niño and the beginning of ENSO-neutral conditions. These neutral conditions continued in Winter, and onto the next year.

== Summary ==
=== North Atlantic Ocean ===
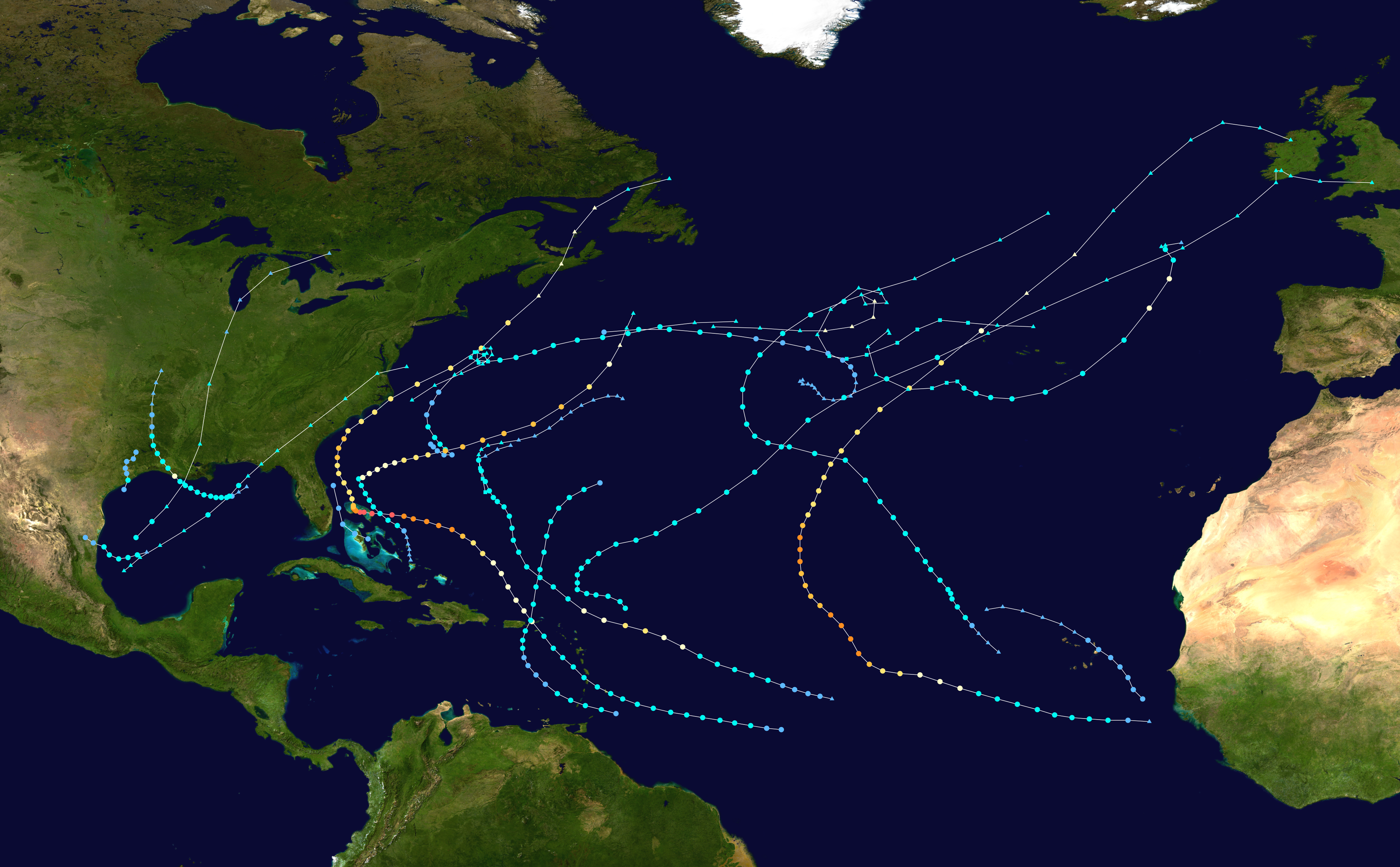
2019 Atlantic hurricane season summary map

The North Atlantic Ocean experienced their fourth-most active season on record, tied with 1969, at 18 named storms. Most of the storms were weak and short-lived, possibly because of moderately high wind shear that persisted throughout the season. Sea surface temperatures, however, were quite high for tropical cyclone development. Saharan dust counts were fairly sedate throughout the month of September. Andrea, Melissa, and Rebekah were the only storms to become subtropical storms throughout some portion of their lives (Andrea and Rebekah were subtropical for their whole lives). The North Atlantic basin featured a record fifth consecutive year for tropical or subtropical development before the month of June, which the record continues when Tropical Storms Arthur and Bertha form on May 16 and 27, 2020, yet marking the sixth year of tropical development before the season actually starts. The season also featured more than one Category 5 Hurricane, making it one of only seven seasons to accomplish such a feat. Hurricane Dorian was the strongest tropical cyclone for the basin in 2019. Dorian peaked with a strength of 185 miles per hour, and peaked at an intensity of 910 hPa/mbar. Dorian is the record-tying strongest landfalling Atlantic hurricane. The record is tied with the Great 1935 Labor Day hurricane. The accumulated cyclone energy (ACE) index value for the individual basin is 132 units, which is only dubbed "above normal", despite the high count of named storms of 18.

=== Eastern and Central Pacific Ocean ===
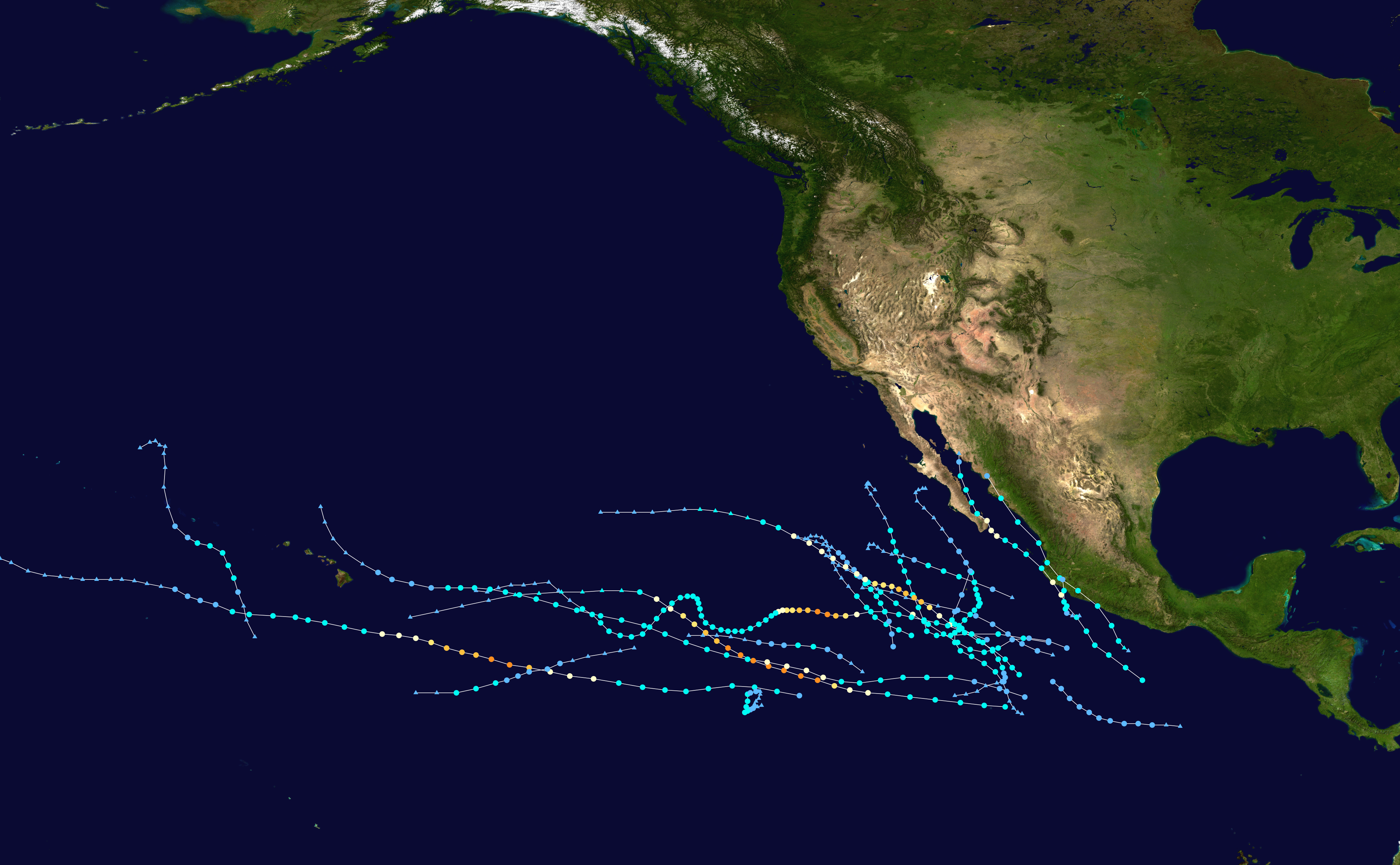
2019 Pacific hurricane season summary map

The Eastern portions of the Pacific Ocean was only moderately active, likely because of a weakening El Niño trend that started in late July. The 2019 Pacific hurricane season featured 21 tropical depressions, 19 named storms, 7 hurricanes, and 4 major hurricanes. The first tropical depression didn't form until June 25; which is the latest start on record, since reliable records were kept in 1971, that a first tropical cyclone ever formed. Alvin, the first tropical storm of the season, did eventually become the first hurricane of the 2019 Pacific hurricane season. Barbara, the strongest hurricane of the basin in 2019, was short-lived. However, Barbara did eventually undergo rapid intensification and peaked as a high end Category 4 hurricane on the modern-day Saffir–Simpson Hurricane Wind Scale. Barbara encountered large portions of wind shear and weakened very rapidly. Barbara's remnants did eventually reach Hawaii, but little to no damage was reported. No hurricanes formed in August. It wasn't until September 1 that the next hurricane formed; Juliette; a high-end Category 3 major hurricane. Tropical Storm Akoni was the first storm of the Central Pacific, as well as the second time the name has been used; the first usage was in 1982. Hurricane Kiko was the longest-lived Pacific hurricane of 2019 that tracked mostly over open waters. Lorena was the most serious hurricane of the season, but minor damage was reported. Tropical Storm Narda did make small impacts in Mexico, but they weren't too serious. Tropical Storm Ema was the second and last storm of the Central Pacific. Tropical Depression Twenty-One-E concluded the season when it dissipated on November 17. The total ACE in the basin is 97.9875 units, which is considered "near normal".

=== Western Pacific Ocean ===
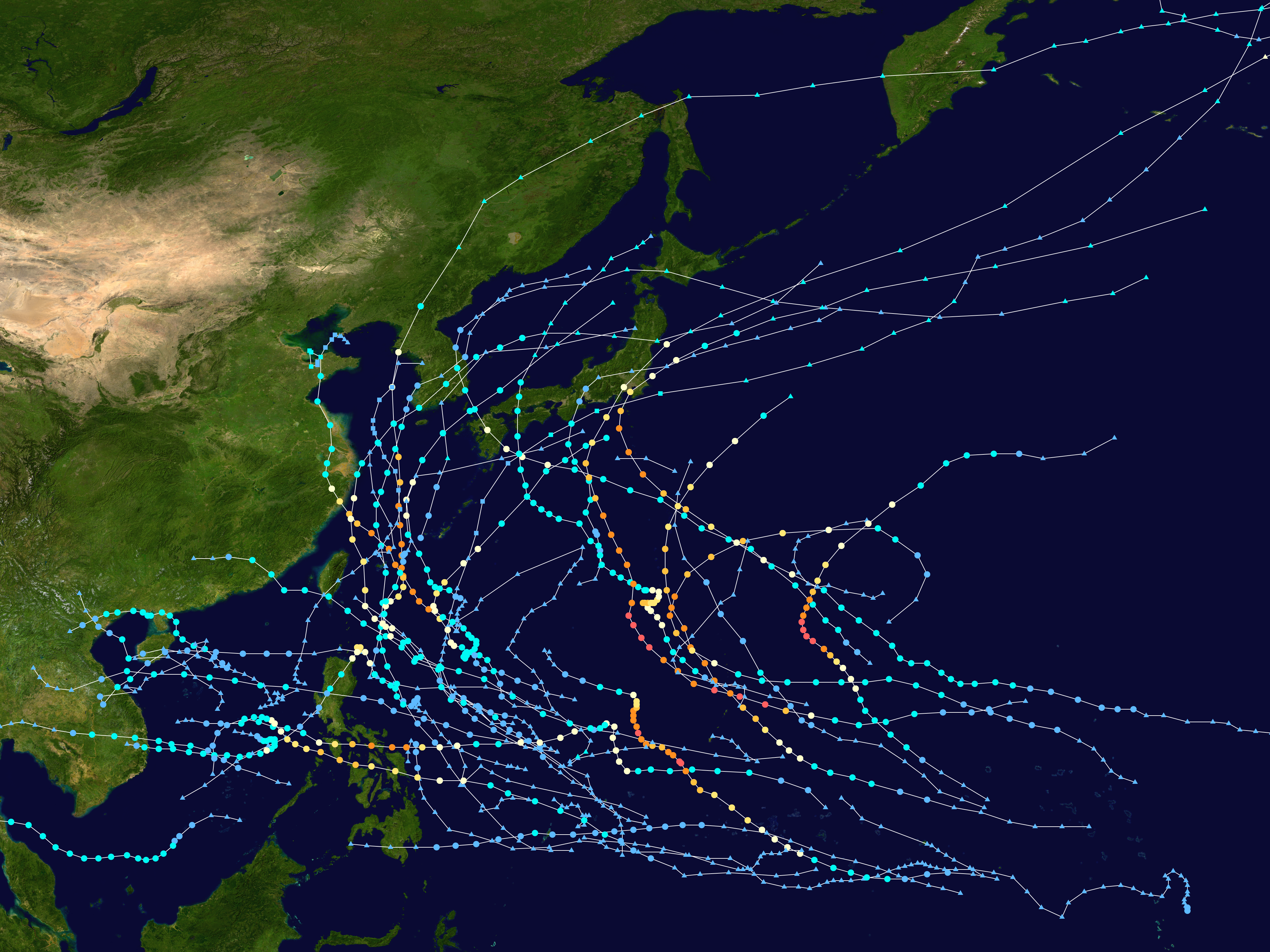
2019 Pacific typhoon season summary map

The Western Pacific typhoon region was fairly above average. It was the costliest Pacific typhoon season on record, breaking the record set by the previous year. The 2019 Pacific typhoon season featured 51 tropical depressions, 29 tropical storms, 17 typhoons, and 5 (unofficial) super typhoons, with 4 attaining Category 5 status. Typhoon Wutip was a rare February Category 5 super typhoon. No other storms strengthened to typhoons until Typhoon Francisco formed in early August. Typhoon Lekima followed it, which later caused extensive damage in South China. Many more tropical storms and typhoons followed. Typhoon Hagibis was the costliest typhoon of the season and on record, inflicting US$15 billion after making landfall on Japan as a Category 1 typhoon. (unadjusted for 2020 inflation). Typhoon Halong became the most intense storm of the season, as well as the most intense of the whole year, peaking at 905 hPa. Typhoons Kammuri and Phanfone wreaked major havoc in the Philippines in December 2019; Kammuri with its Category 4 landfall, and Phanfone with its high death toll as a prolonged Category 2 typhoon. The accumulated cyclone energy (ACE) index of this season amounted to 269 units, which is considered "near normal".

=== North Indian Ocean ===
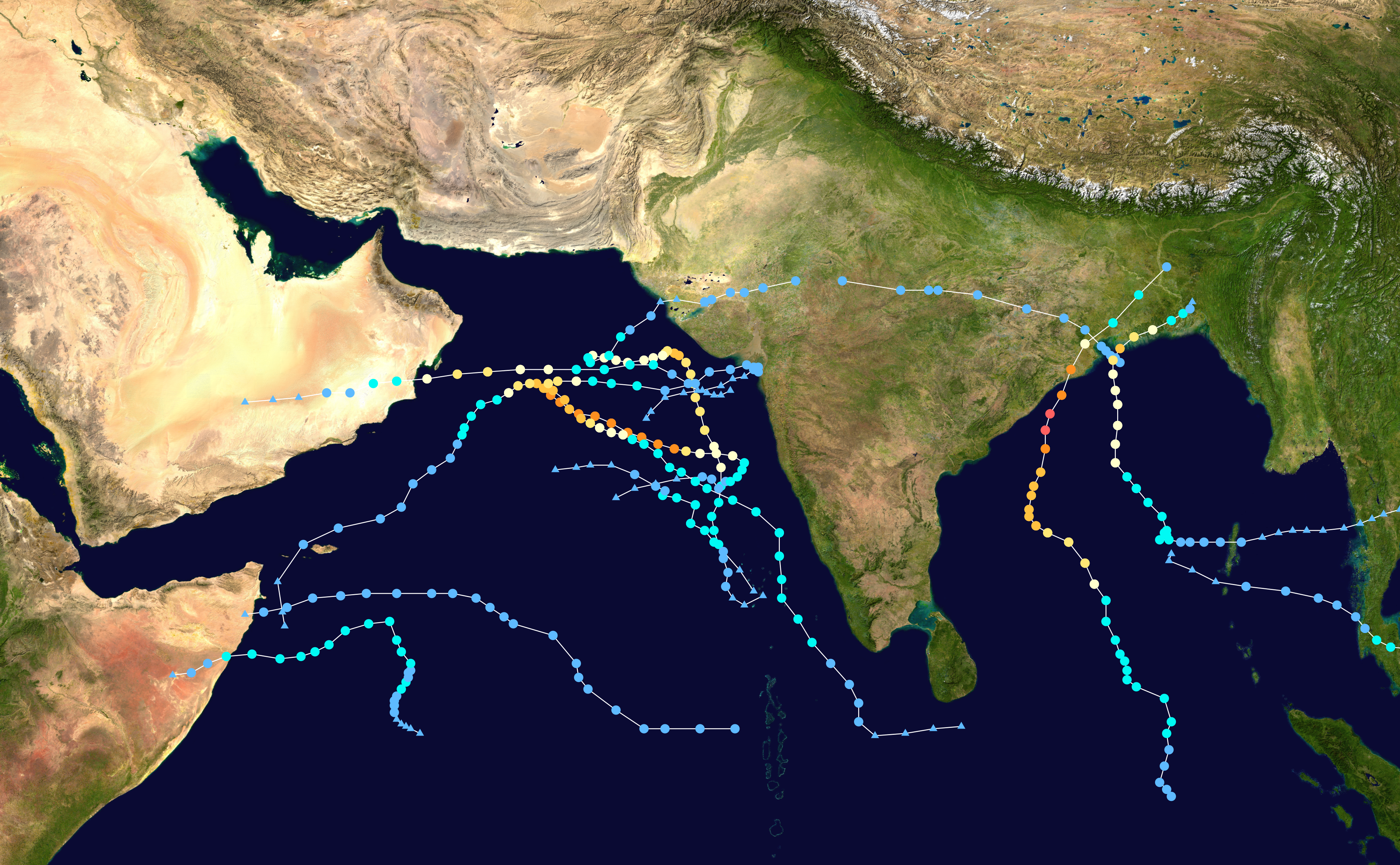
2019 North Indian Ocean cyclone season summary map

The season was the most active North Indian Ocean cyclone season ever recorded in terms of cyclonic storms, though the 1992 season saw more tropical storms according to the Joint Typhoon Warning Center. The season featured 12 depressions, 11 deep depressions, 8 cyclonic storms, a record 6 severe cyclonic storms, a record 6 very severe cyclonic storms, a record 3 extremely severe cyclonic storms, and 1 super cyclonic storm, Kyarr, the first since Cyclone Gonu in 2007. Additionally, it was also the third-costliest season recorded in the North Indian Ocean, only behind the 2020 and 2008 seasons.

Amid a weak El Niño event, the season's first named storm, Pabuk, entered the basin on January 4, becoming the earliest-forming cyclonic storm of the North Indian Ocean on record, tying with the 2014 season. The second cyclonic storm of the season, Fani, formed on April 26. Fani became an extremely severe cyclonic storm on April 30, reaching the equivalent of Category 5 status on the Saffir–Simpson scale, then made landfall in India killing 89 people between Odisha and Bangladesh; Fani caused $8.1 billion in damage.

In early June, a strong pulse of the Madden–Julian oscillation (MJO) led to the development of the third cyclonic storm, Vayu, which formed June 10 in the Arabian Sea near the Maldives. The storm subsequently intensified into a very severe cyclonic storm on June 12, after moving northwestward towards northwestern India and Pakistan. No tropical cyclones formed in the month of July. Deep Depression BOB 03 formed on August 7 before impacting East India and Bangladesh. In late September, Deep Depression ARB 02 formed near Gujarat and intensified into the fourth cyclonic storm of the season, Hikaa. Cyclonic Storm Kyarr formed on October 24 and three days later became the first super cyclonic storm since Cyclone Gonu in 2007. The sixth cyclonic storm and a record-breaking fifth very severe cyclonic storm, Cyclone Maha, formed on October 30 after Kyarr dissipated on November 1. Soon afterward, on November 6, the remnants of Severe Tropical Storm Matmo crossed the Southeast Asia overland and again consolidated into a depression. It further rapidly intensified into Very Severe Cyclonic Storm Bulbul. Three more Deep Depressions formed in Arabian Sea in quick succession early in the month of December, of which one strengthened into the eighth cyclone of the season, Cyclone Pawan, which made landfall in Somalia on December 6.

The high amount of activity in the Arabian Sea was related to the strongest Indian Ocean Dipole in 60 years, in which the waters are warmer in the western Indian Ocean than the eastern.

Tropical cyclones have been recorded in the North Indian Ocean since 1891. The 2019 season was the first since 1902 that experienced the development of six severe cyclonic storms out of eight cyclonic storms; in 1902, five cyclonic storms formed and four of them became severe cyclonic storms. The season has also produced the most accumulated cyclone energy in this basin on record.

=== South-West Indian Ocean ===
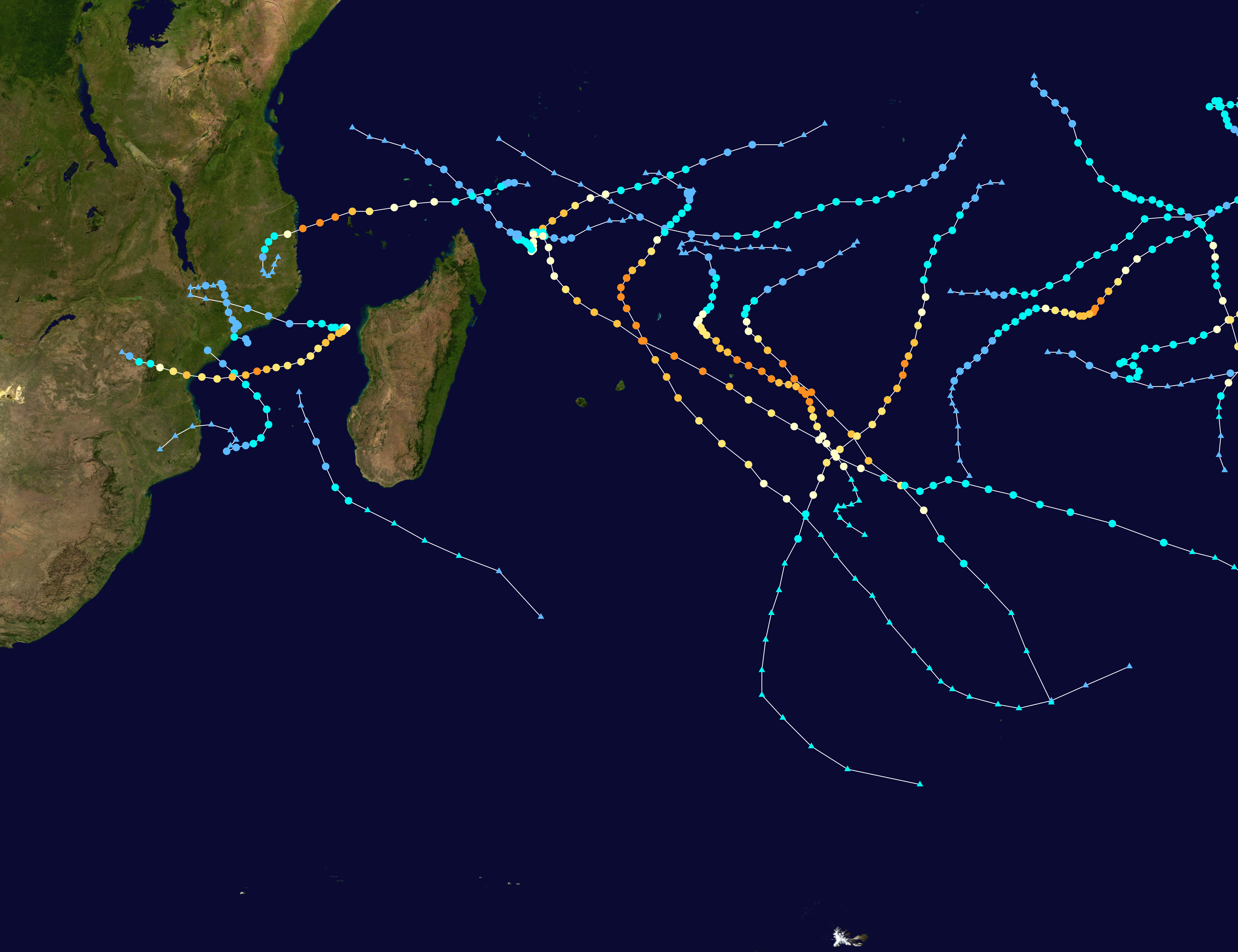
2018–19 South-West Indian Ocean cyclone season summary map

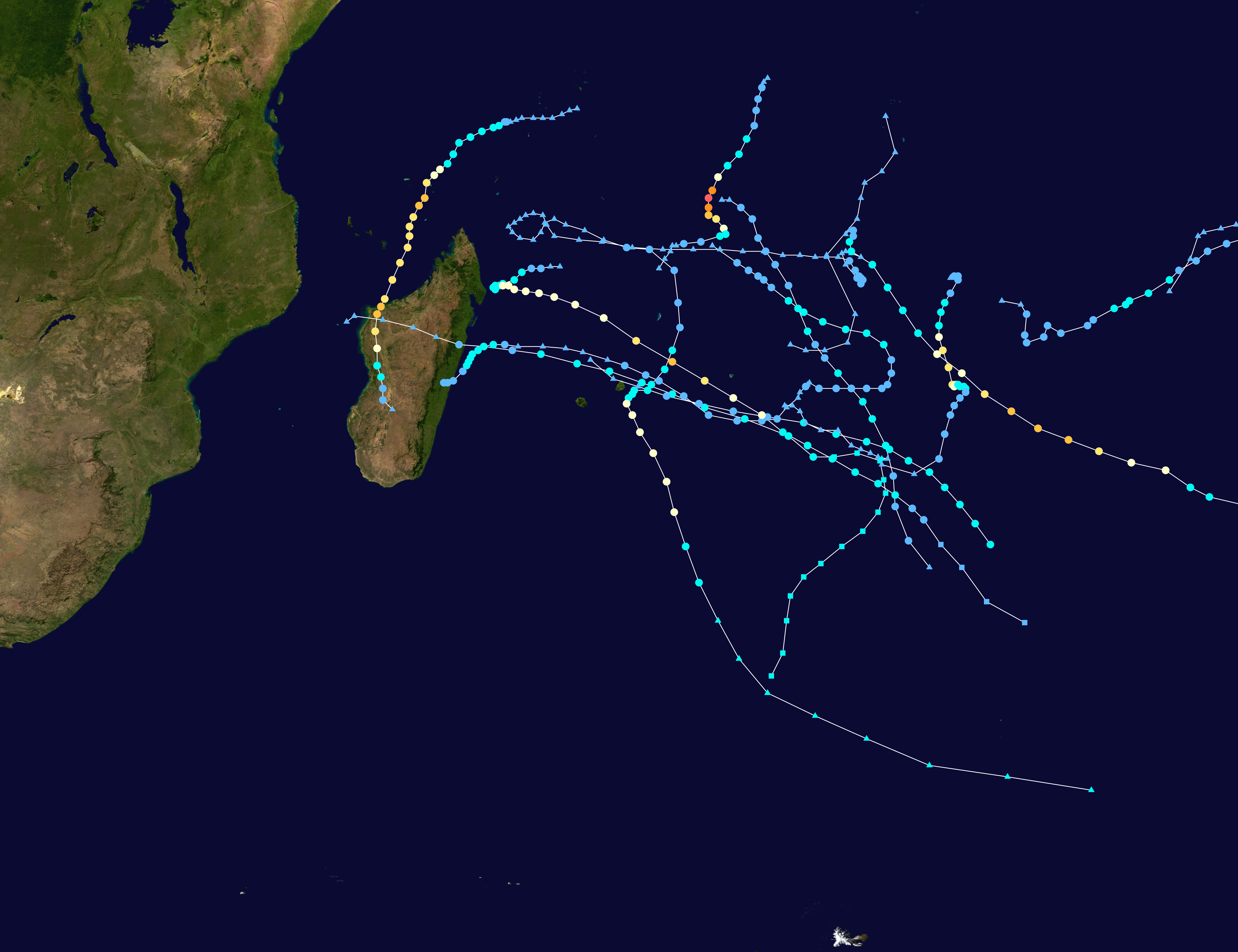
2019–20 South-West Indian Ocean cyclone season summary map

==== January–June ====
The 2018–19 South-West Indian Ocean cyclone season was the costliest and the most active season ever recorded since reliable records began in 1967. Additionally, it is also the deadliest cyclone season recorded in the South-West Indian Ocean, surpassing the 1891–92 season, in which the 1892 Mauritius cyclone devastated the island of Mauritius. Two moderate tropical storms formed at the start of this year, Desmond and Eketsang. Five more intense tropical cyclones formed during February and March: Funani, Gelena, Haleh, Idai, and Joaninha. In addition, Savannah crossed into the basin from the Australian basin as an intense tropical cyclone in March. Of these storms, all of them but Haleh and Savannah produced impacts on land, with Idai causing at least 1,303 deaths and leaving at least 2,262 people missing, and causing US$2.2 billion in damages in Mozambique, Zimbabwe, Malawi, and Madagascar. The season set a new record of nine intense tropical cyclones, the largest number since the start of reliable satellite coverage in 1967, surpassing the 2006–07 season.

==== July–December ====
The 2019–20 South-West Indian Ocean cyclone season was a slightly above-average season in tropical cyclone and subtropical cyclone formation west of 90°E. The season officially began on November 15, however, the formation of the first system—Zone of Disturbed Weather 01—occurred on July 22, 2019 (which failed to organize into a tropical depression), well before the official start of the season. This was the earliest start to a season since the 2016–17 season. For the second consecutive year in a row, the first system formed before the official start of the season. Afterwards, three storms formed in the month of December: Tropical Cyclone Belna on December 2, which brought flooding and strong wind to northwestern Madagascar, Very Intense Tropical Cyclone Ambali, which formed a day later and became the first very intense tropical cyclone in the basin since Fantala in 2016, and Tropical Cyclone Calvinia which stalled near Mauritius and brought heavy rain and moderate flooding to the island nation towards the end of the month, crossing into 2020.

=== Australian region ===
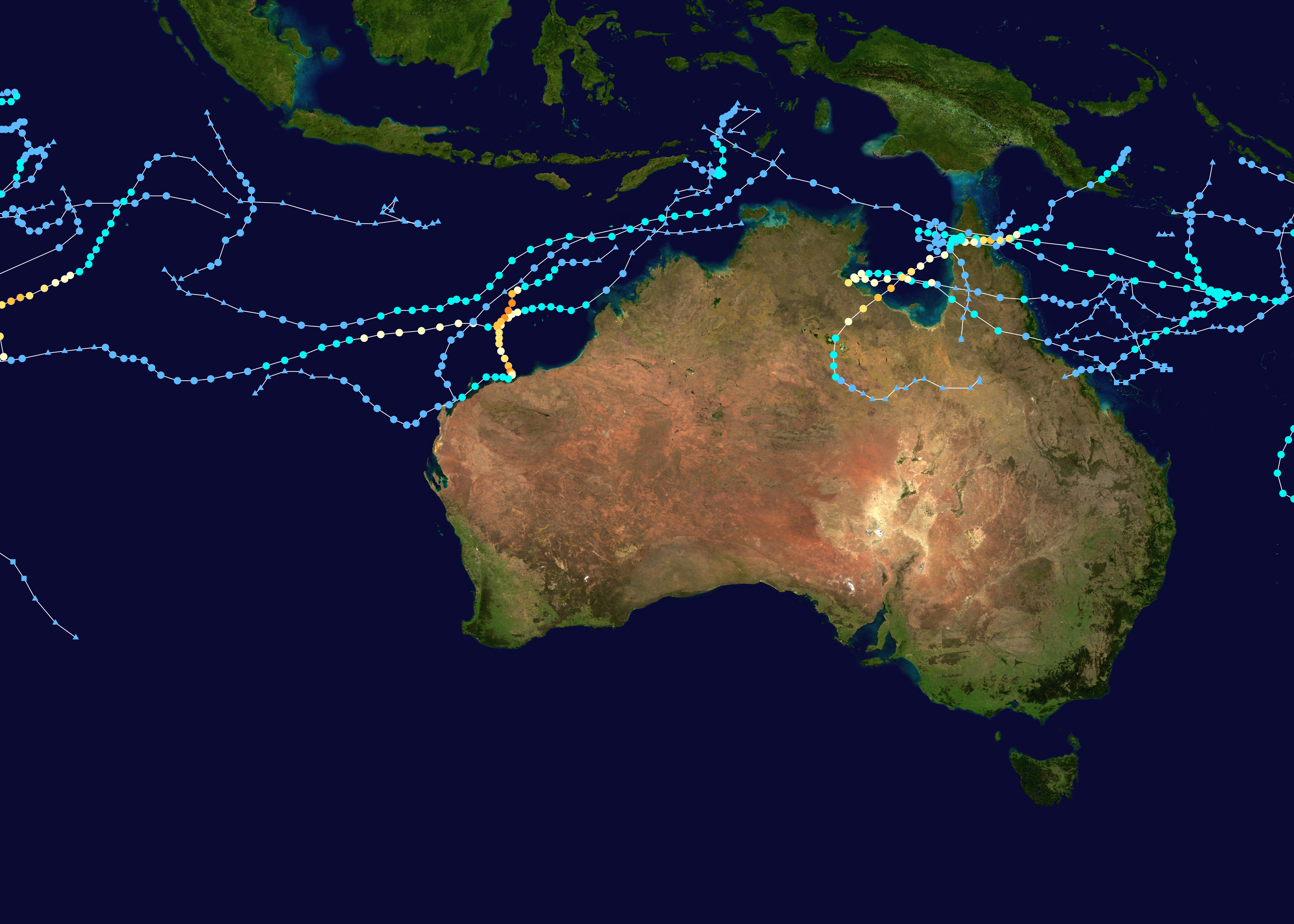
2018–19 Australian region cyclone season summary Map

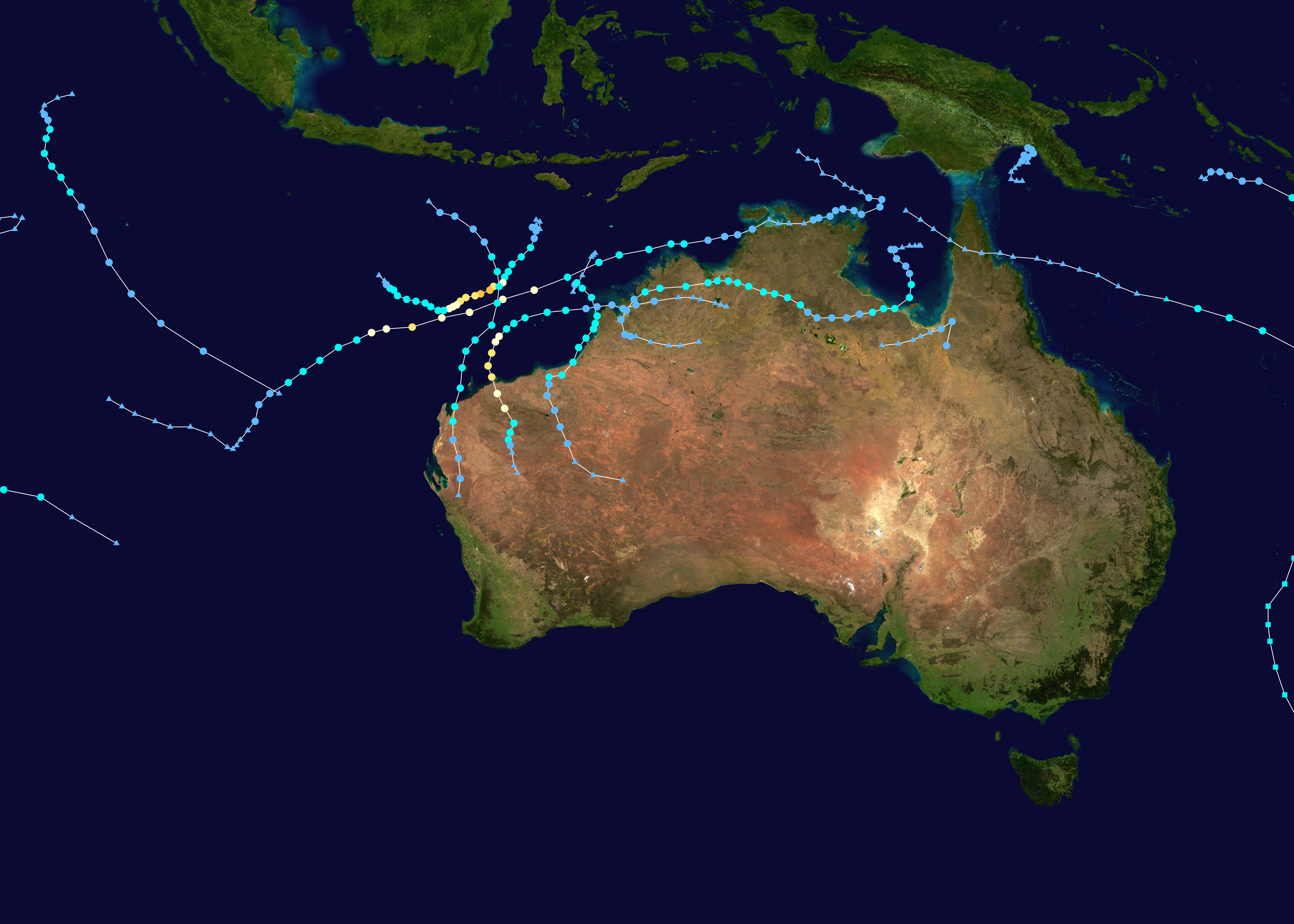
2019–20 Australian region cyclone season summary Map

==== January–June ====
The 2018–19 Australian region cyclone season was an average season that saw the formation of 11 tropical cyclones, six of which intensified further to become severe tropical cyclones. The season officially began on November 1, 2018, and concluded on April 30, 2019; however, as evidenced by Tropical Low Liua in September 2018 and Tropical Cyclones Lili and Ann in May 2019, tropical cyclones can form at any time of the year. As such, any system existing between July 1, 2018, and June 30, 2019, would count towards the season total.

This was the first Australian tropical cyclone season since 2014–15 to feature at least six severe tropical cyclones. It was also the third season in a row to begin prior to the official commencement date of November 1, in this instance with the development of Tropical Low Liua on September 26, 2018. The most active month was December 2018, with a total of seven tropical lows existing in the region at some time during the month. The three strongest storms of the season—Veronica, Trevor and Savannah—all developed in March 2019, and together affected all three of the Bureau of Meteorology's Australian sub-regions as severe tropical cyclones. Overall, a total of five tropical cyclones existed within each of the three sub-regions throughout the season, representing an above-average season for both the Eastern Region and the Northern Region, but a below-average season for the Western Region. The season concluded much later than usual, and well after the official ending date of April 30. Two tropical cyclones developed during May—Lili in the eastern Indonesian archipelago and Ann in the Coral Sea—both of which made landfall as tropical lows after weakening from tropical cyclone intensity. At its peak, Ann was a Category 2 tropical cyclone, and was the strongest storm to form in the Australian region during May since Severe Tropical Cyclone Rhonda in 1997. In total, eight systems were named by the BOM during the season, with two named by the BMKG and one by the FMS.

==== July–December ====
The 2019–20 season was a below average tropical cyclone season for the waters surrounding Australia between longitudes 90°E and 160°E. A total of eight tropical cyclones formed during the season, which represents the region's least active season since the 2016–17 season. Three systems intensified further into severe tropical cyclones, and three systems made landfall within the region at tropical cyclone intensity.

The season had an unusually late start with the first system, Blake, forming in early January, well after the official start of the season. Blake would later make landfall in northwestern Australia and soon degenerate afterwards. At the same time, Claudia, another tropical cyclone, formed. It persisted for two weeks and reached category 3 on the Australian tropical cyclone scale before dissipating west of Australia. Later that month, a tropical low formed and lasted for a week before dissipating in late January without been named. Three other tropical lows formed in late January and early February. One of them dissipated later. Another one of them has been moving in and out of the Australian region. It was designated 06F by the Fiji Meteorological Service. The third one intensified into Cyclone Damien. In late February, 2 new tropical lows formed, and were named Esther and Ferdinand. Esther didn't strengthen much, but Ferdinand went on to become a Category 3 severe tropical cyclone, equivalent to a Category 2 Atlantic hurricane.

=== South Pacific Ocean ===
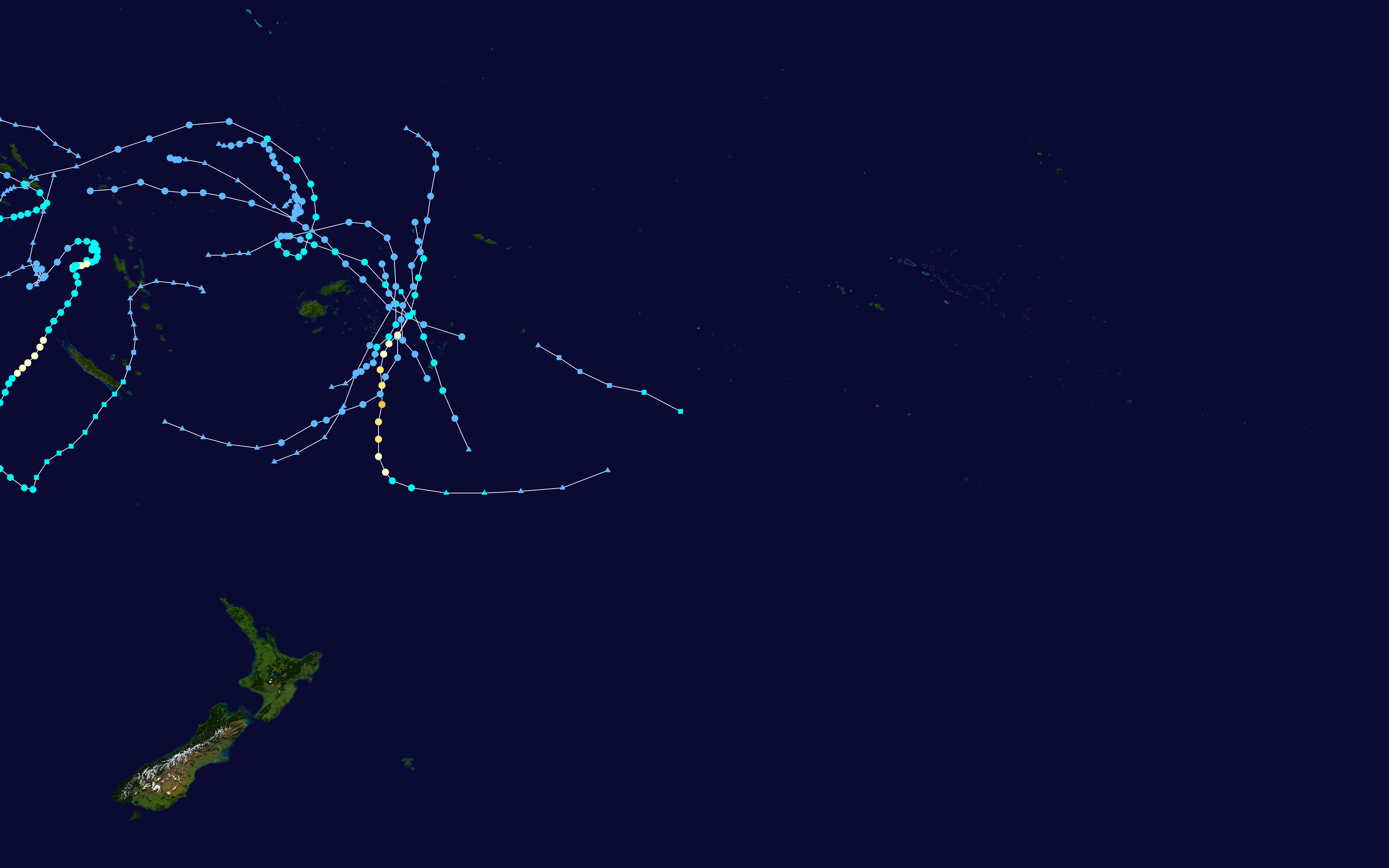
2018–19 South Pacific cyclone season summary Map

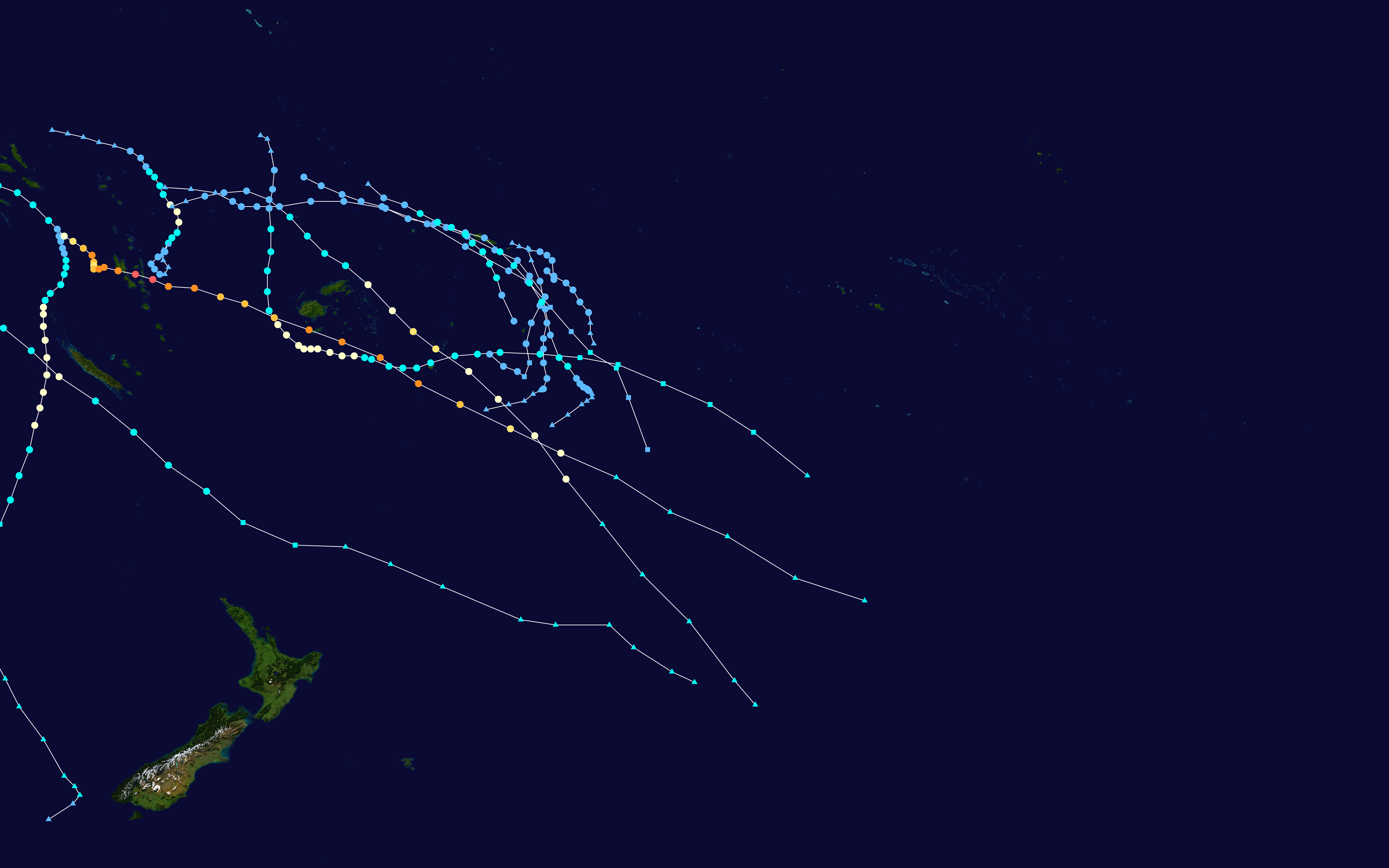
2019–20 South Pacific cyclone season summary Map

==== July – December ====
The 2019–20 season was a slightly above-average season in which tropical cyclones formed within the South Pacific Ocean to the east of 160°E. The season has been near-average in terms of activity, with eight tropical cyclones and four severe tropical cyclones forming during the season.

The season began with the arrival of Tropical Depression 01F on November 22, near the Solomon Islands, which would later become Tropical Cyclone Rita. Rita would then peak as a Category 3 on the Australian scale. Tropical Disturbance 02F was designated sometime later, but didn't last long after that. Sarai formed on December 23, lasting into the new year before finally ceasing to exist on January 2. Not too long after that, Tino formed and affected eastern Fiji and the surrounding area before dissipating. On January 24, a depression formed and dissipated the next day without been named. In early February, another low originally in the Australian region crossed the 160th meridian east and emerged in the South Pacific. It strengthened into severe tropical cyclone Uesi and affected New Caledonia and New Zealand. In mid-February four disturbances formed, 07F, 08F, 09F and 10F. 07F & 08F dissipated before becoming tropical depressions but the other 2 strengthened into tropical cyclones Vicky and Wasi. In mid March, Gretel entered the basin. It dissipated shortly afterwards. In early April, Harold also entered the basin from the Australian region. It rapidly intensified into a Category 5 Severe tropical cyclone as it impacted Vanuatu.

=== South Atlantic Ocean ===
There are two systems that formed during this year, Iba and Jaguar. Iba was the first tropical storm to develop in the basin since Anita in 2010, as well as the first fully tropical system to be named from the Brazilian naming list, while Jaguar was a subtropical storm that failed to develop.

=== Mediterranean sea ===
Two medicanes formed in this year, Scott and Trudy (Detlef).

== Systems ==
=== January ===
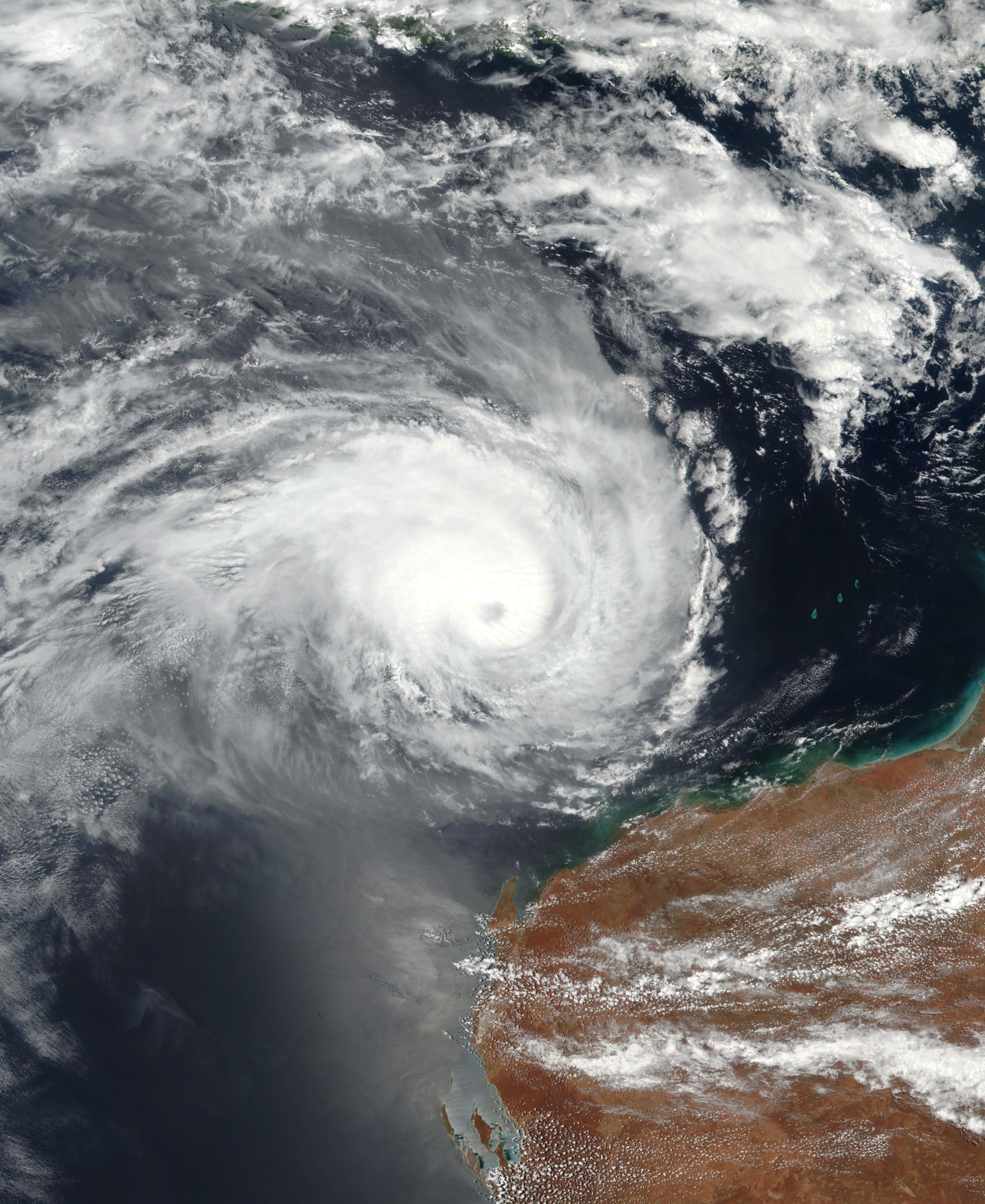
Cyclone Riley

The month of January was inactive, with only six tropical cyclones forming, of which three were named. Tropical Storm Pabuk was the earliest-forming tropical storm of the western Pacific Ocean on record, breaking the previous record held by Typhoon Alice in 1979. Pabuk killed 10 people in Vietnam, Thailand and Malaysia, causing $151 million (US$2019) in damage. Moderate Tropical Storm Eketsang killed 27 people in Madagascar in late-January.

Tropical cyclones formed in January 2019
Storm name	Dates active	Max wind km/h (mph)	Pressure (hPa)	Areas affected	Damage (USD)	Deaths	Refs
01W (Amang)	January 4–22	55 (35)	1004	Kiribati, Marshall Islands, Caroline Islands, Philippines	$4.11 million	9	
11U	January 15–23	55(35)	1004	Java	None	None	
Desmond	January 17–22	65 (40)	995	Mozambique, Madagascar	Unknown	None	
Riley	January 19–30	120 (75)	974	Maluku Islands, East Timor, West Australia	None	None	
13U	January 21–25	55 (35)	999	Cape York Peninsula	None	None	
Eketsang	January 22–24	75 (45)	993	Madagascar	Unknown	27	

=== February ===
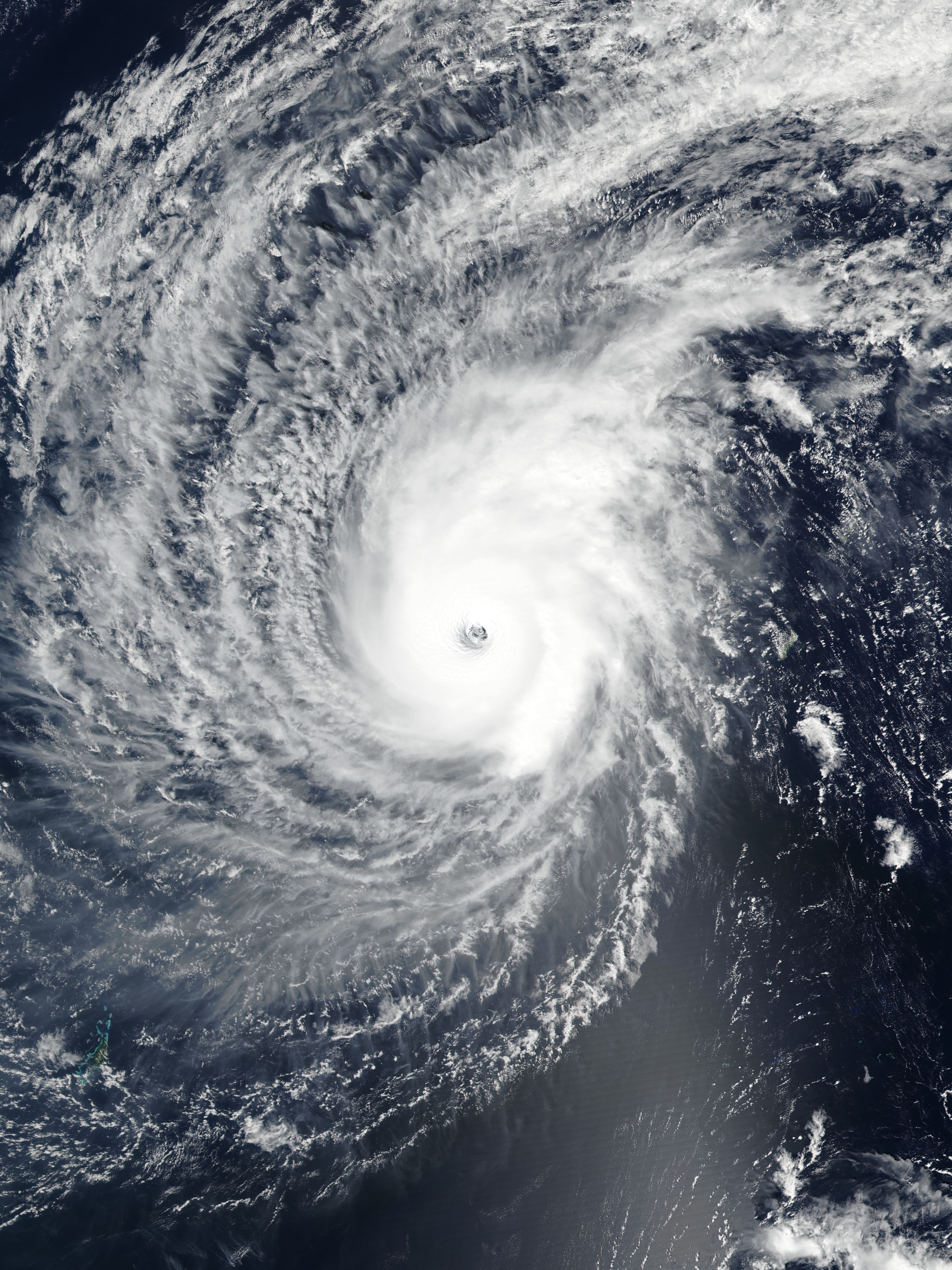
Typhoon Wutip

The month of February was inactive, with only ten tropical cyclones forming, of which seven were named. However, Typhoon Wutip became the most-intense typhoon recorded in the month of February.

Tropical cyclones formed in February 2019
Storm name	Dates active	Max wind km/h (mph)	Pressure (hPa)	Areas affected	Damage (USD)	Deaths	Refs
Funani	February 3–10	195 (120)	940	Rodrigues	None	None	
06F	February 3–9	65 (40)	994	Wallis and Futuna, Samoan Islands	None	None	
Gelena	February 4–14	205 (125)	942	Madagascar, Mauritius, Rodrigues	$1.02 million	None	
Oma	February 7–22	130 (80)	974	Vanuatu, New Caledonia, Solomon Islands, Queensland, New South Wales	$51 million	1	
Neil	February 8–10	65 (40)	994	Wallis and Futuna, Fiji, Tonga	None	None	
08F	February 10–13	Unspecified	996	Fiji, Tonga	None	None	
10F	February 11–13	Unspecified	996	Wallis and Futuna, Fiji	None	None	
Wutip (Betty)	February 18 – March 2	195 (120)	920	Caroline Islands, Guam	$3.3 million	None	
Pola	February 23 – March 2	165 (105)	950	Wallis and Futuna, Fiji, Tonga	None	None	
Haleh	February 28 – March 7	175 (110)	945	None	None	None	

=== March ===
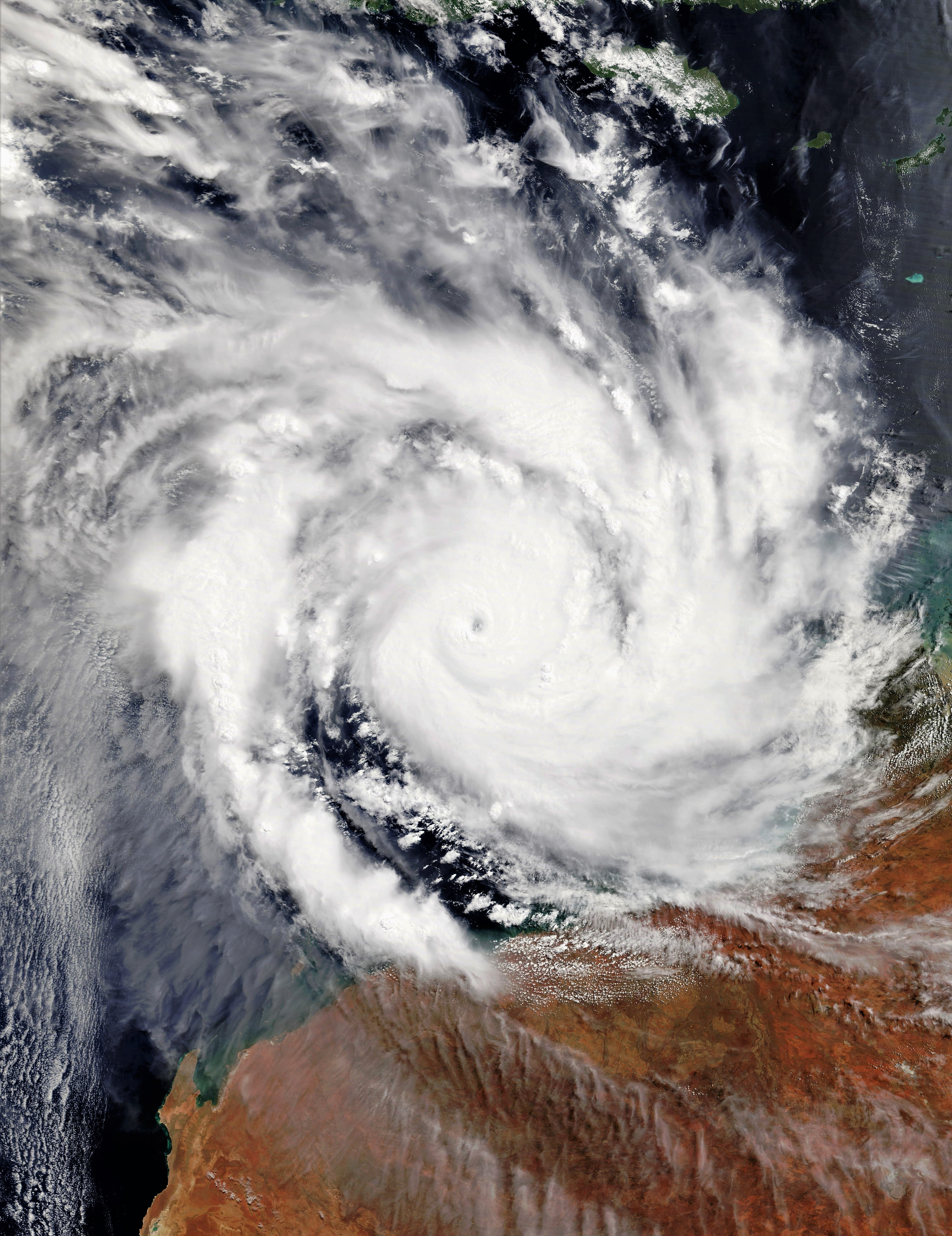
Cyclone Veronica

Ten tropical cyclones formed in the month of March, including six named tropical cyclones. A total of five systems strengthened into the equivalent of at least a Category 3 major hurricane on the Saffir Simpson hurricane wind scale (SSHWS)—the first such occurrence since September 2018. The month featured Cyclone Idai, which is currently the deadliest tropical cyclone of the year, responsible for 1,007 deaths in southern Africa. Idai was also the costliest cyclone in the South-West Indian Ocean basin, inflicting more than $2 billion (USD) in damages. Tropical Storm Iba became the first tropical cyclone to develop in the South Atlantic since Anita in 2010.

Tropical cyclones formed in March 2019
Storm name	Dates active	Max wind km/h (mph)	Pressure (hPa)	Areas affected	Damage (USD)	Deaths	Refs
Idai	March 4–16	195 (120)	940	Mozambique, Malawi, Madagascar, Zimbabwe	≥$2 billion	1,303	
15U	March 6–11	Unspecified	1007	Maluku Islands	None	None	
Savannah	March 7–20	175 (110)	951	Bali, Java, Christmas Island, Cocos (Keeling) Islands	>$7.5 million	10	
TL	March 13–14	Unspecified	Unspecified	None	None	None	
03W (Chedeng)	March 14–19	Unspecified	1006	Palau, Philippines	$23,000	None	
Trevor	March 15–26	175 (110)	950	Papua New Guinea, Queensland, Northern Territory	$710 thousand	None	
Veronica	March 18–31	215 (130)	928	Timor, Western Australia	$1.2 billion	None	
Joaninha	March 18–30	185 (115)	939	Rodrigues	None	None	
Iba	March 23–28	85 (55)	1006	Brazil	None	None	
TL	March 31 – April 3	Unspecified	1005	Southeastern Papua New Guinea	None	None	

=== April ===
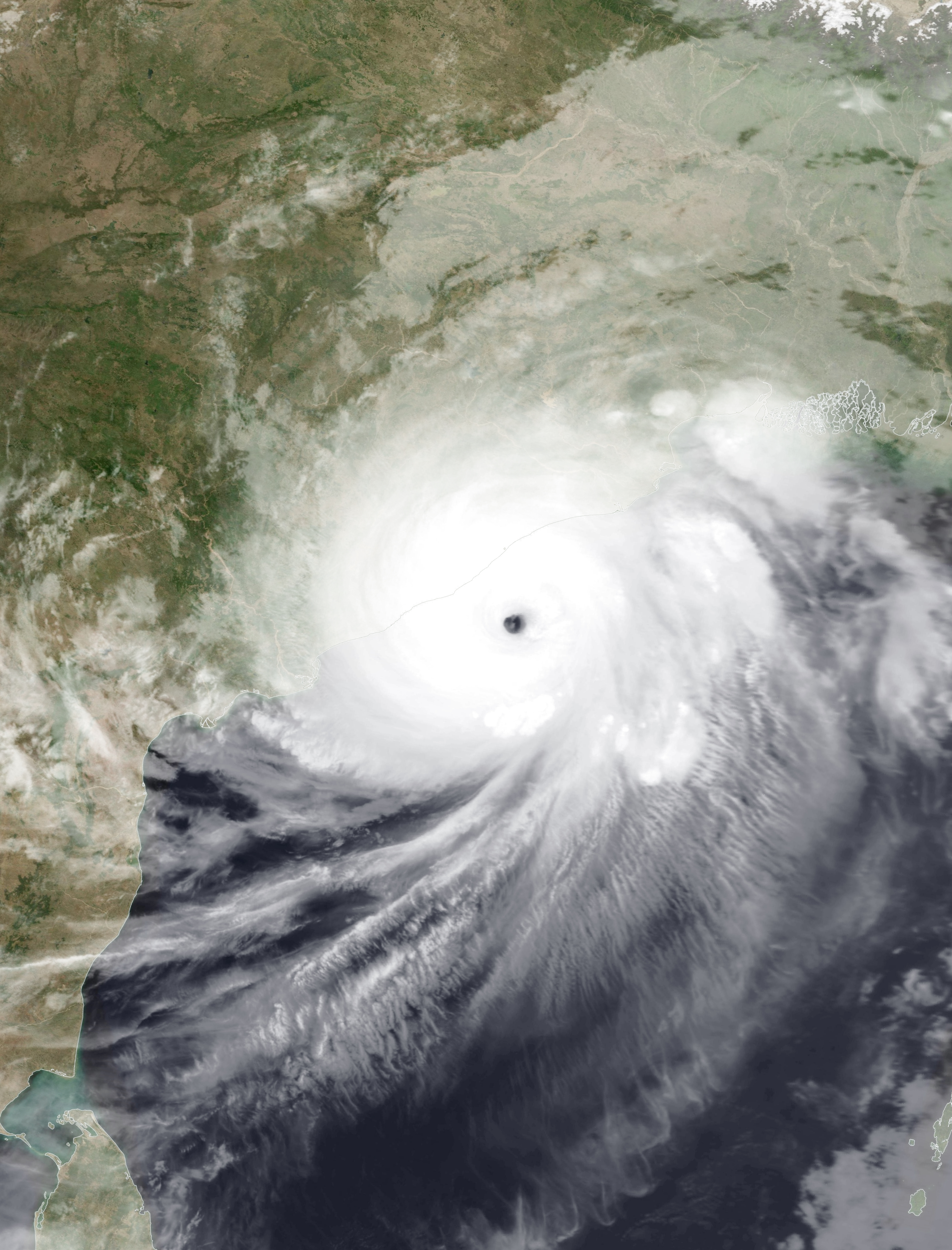
Cyclone Fani

April was an inactive month with six cyclones forming, of which four were named. Cyclone Kenneth became the most intense tropical cyclone to make landfall in Mozambique on record. Kenneth killed 48 people, of which 41 were killed in the country of Mozambique. Cyclone Fani struck parts of India and Bangladesh, killing 72 people in Odisha, 17 people in Bangladesh, and 8 in Uttar Pradesh.

Tropical cyclones formed in April 2019
Storm name	Dates active	Max wind km/h (mph)	Pressure (hPa)	Areas affected	Damage (USD)	Deaths	Refs
Wallace	April 1–16	120 (75)	980	Eastern Indonesia, Northern Territory, East Timor, Western Australia, Cocos (Keeling) Islands	None	None	
22U	April 5–15	65 (40)	1006	New Guinea, Queensland, Northern Territory, Western Australia	None	None	
Kenneth	April 21–29	215 (130)	934	Seychelles, Madagascar, Comoros, Mozambique, Tanzania, Malawi	>$100 million	50	
Lorna	April 21 – May 1	150 (90)	964	None	None	None	
TL	April 21–26	55 (35)	1003	Sumatra, Cocos (Keeling) Islands	None	None	
Fani	April 26 – May 4	215 (130)	932	Sri Lanka, Odisha, Andhra Pradesh, East India, Bangladesh, Bhutan	$8.12 billion	89	

=== May ===
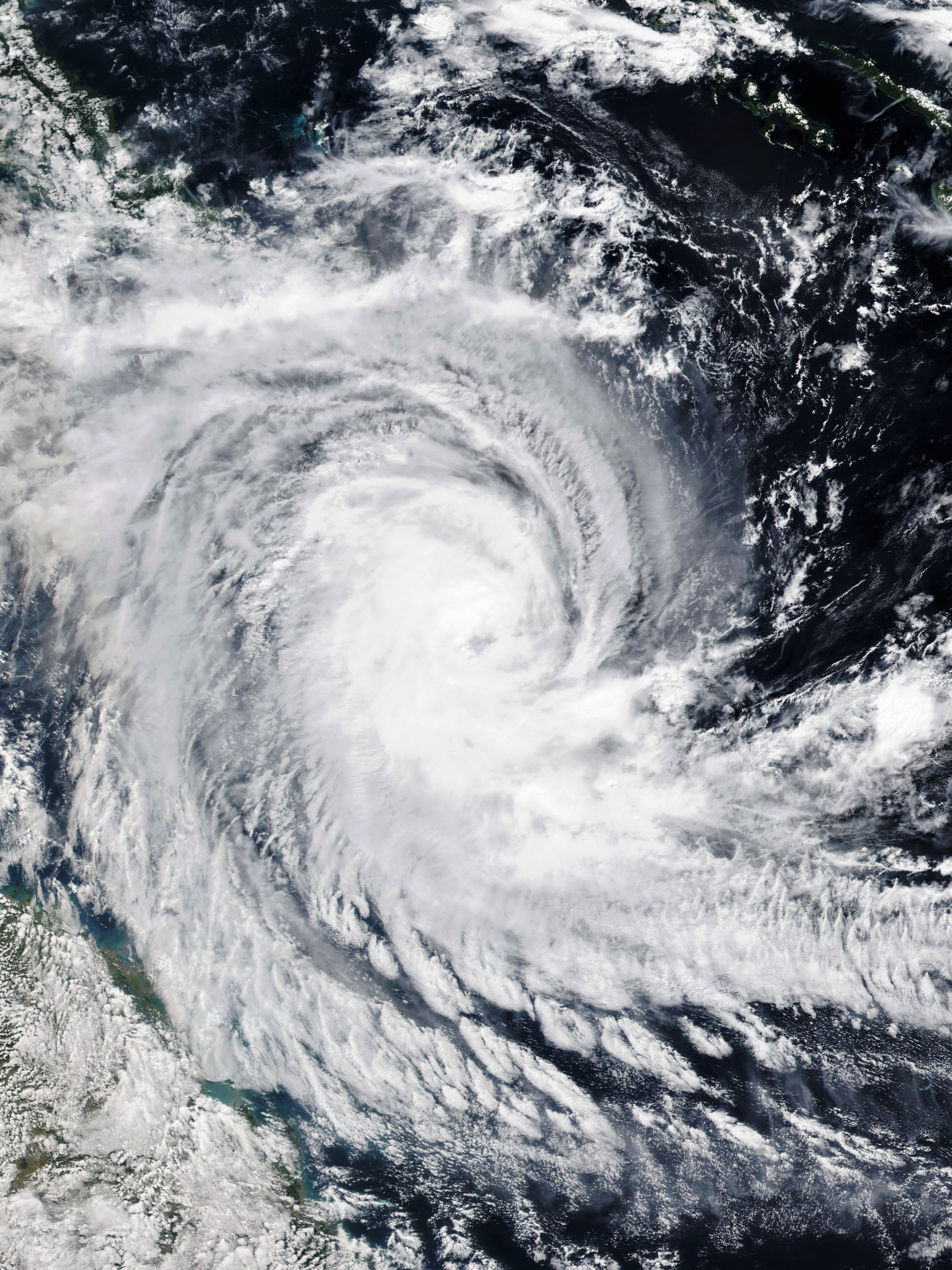
Cyclone Ann

May was a relatively inactive month with eight tropical cyclones forming. Four of these tropical cyclones reached the required intensity threshold to receive official names. Cyclone Lili developed at the beginning of the Australian region off-season, and struck East Timor and Indonesia's Maluku Islands, with rainfall-induced flooding causing minor damage to infrastructure and residential property. Cyclone Ann, another off-season Australian system, developed into a strong tropical storm on the SSHWS, and made landfall in Far North Queensland as a tropical low. Ann was the strongest Australian cyclone to develop in May since Rhonda in 1997. A subtropical storm named Jaguar formed in the South Atlantic, marking the second South Atlantic cyclone of the year, the first time two have occurred in the same year since 2016. The formation of the short-lived Subtropical Storm Andrea to the southwest of Bermuda began the Atlantic hurricane season early for the fifth year in a row.

Storm name	Dates active	Max wind km/h (mph)	Pressure (hPa)	Areas affected	Damage (USD)	Deaths	Refs
Lili	May 4–11	75 (45)	997	Eastern Indonesia, East Timor, Top End, Kimberley	Moderate	None	
TD	May 7–8	Unspecified	1006	Yap Islands, Palau	None	None	
TD	May 7–15	Unspecified	1004	Caroline Islands	None	None	
Ann	May 7–18	95 (60)	993	Solomon Islands, New Caledonia, Southern Papua New Guinea, Queensland, Top End, Eastern Indonesia, East Timor	None	None	
TD	May 10–11	Unspecified	1006	Yap Islands, Palau	None	None	
12F	May 16–21	55 (35)	1002	None	None	None	
Jaguar	May 20–22	65 (40)	1010	Brazil	None	None	
Andrea	May 20–21	65 (40)	1006	Bermuda	None	None	

=== June ===
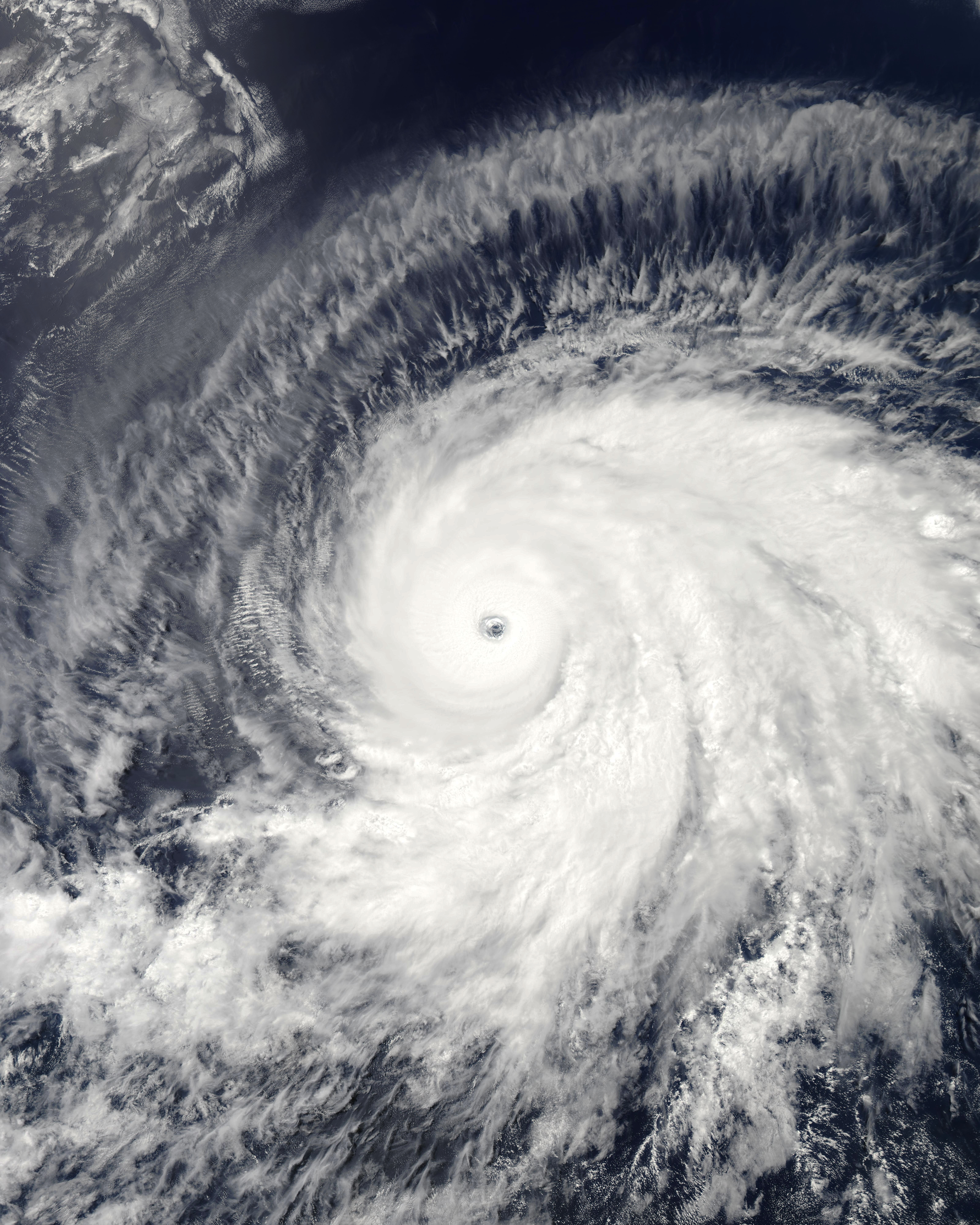
Hurricane Barbara

June was an inactive month in terms of the number of tropical cyclones formed, with only four systems occurring in total. June 1 also marked the official commencement of the Atlantic hurricane season. After the year's longest period without any cyclone activity, the first system in the Arabian Sea for the 2019 North Indian Ocean cyclone season formed on June 10. Named Vayu, the system intensified into a high-end very severe cyclonic storm on the Indian scale, equivalent to a minimal Category 3 major hurricane on the SSHWS. Late in the month, Hurricane Alvin became the first tropical cyclone of the Eastern Pacific hurricane season, marking the latest start to the season since reliable records began in 1971. A tropical depression briefly reached tropical storm intensity near Japan on June 27, and was named Sepat. The cyclone was the first tropical storm to form in the western Pacific in four months.

Storm name	Dates active	Max wind km/h (mph)	Pressure (hPa)	Areas affected	Damage (USD)	Deaths	Refs
Vayu	June 10–19	150 (90)	978	Northern Maldives, Lakshadweep, Western India, Southeastern Pakistan	>$140 thousand	8	
Sepat (Dodong)	June 17–28	75 (45)	992	Caroline Islands, Japan	None	None	
TD	June 26	55 (35)	1000	Ryukyu Islands, South Korea, Japan	None	None	
Alvin	June 25–29	120 (75)	992	Clarion Island	None	None	
04W (Egay)	June 26 – July 1	55 (35)	1006	Caroline Islands, Palau	None	None	
Barbara	June 30 – July 6	250 (155)	930	None	None	None	

=== July ===
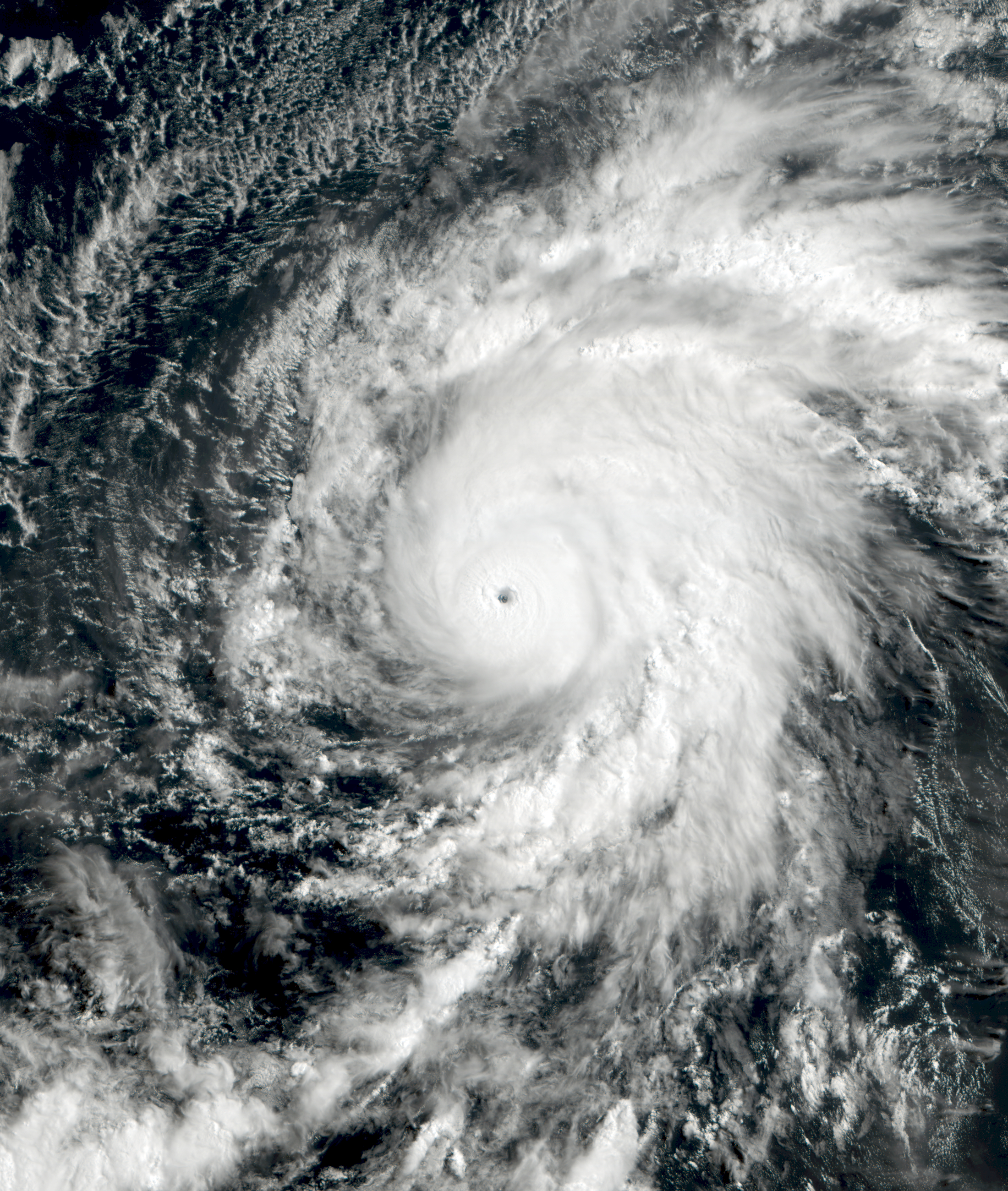
Hurricane Erick

The month of July was the third most active month in terms of total tropical cyclones and in terms of named storms in the year, with thirteen tropical cyclones forming, of which nine were named, behind August. Among these storms, Hurricane Barry made landfall between Midwestern United States and Southeastern United States as tropical storm, causing US$500 million in damages and one person was indirectly killed by the storm.

Storm name	Dates active	Max wind km/h (mph)	Pressure (hPa)	Areas affected	Damage (USD)	Deaths	Refs
Mun	July 1–4	65 (40)	992	Hainan, South China, Paracel Islands, Vietnam, Laos	$240 thousand	2	
Cosme	July 6–8	85 (50)	1001	None	None	None	
Barry	July 11–15	120 (75)	991	Midwestern United States, Southeastern United States, Gulf Coast of the United States, Arkansas, Oklahoma, Great Lakes region, Northeastern United States	≥ $600 million	0 (1)	
Four-E	July 12–14	55 (35)	1006	None	None	None	
Danas (Falcon)	July 12–21	85 (50)	985	Yap Islands, Philippines, Taiwan, Ryukyu Islands, East China, Japan, Korean Peninsula, North China, Russian Far East, Kuril Islands	$6.4 million	6	
Goring	July 17–19	55 (35)	996	Philippines, Taiwan, Ryukyu Islands	None	None	
Dalila	July 22–25	65 (40)	1005	Panama, Costa Rica, Nicaragua	None	None	
Three	July 22–23	50 (30)	1013	Bahamas	None	None	
01	July 22–24	45 (30)	1001	None	None	None	
Nari	July 24–27	65 (40)	998	Bonin Islands, Japan	None	None	
Erick	July 27 – August 5	215 (130)	952	Hawaii	None	None	
Flossie	July 28 – August 6	130 (80)	990	Hawaii	None	None	
Wipha	July 30 – August 3	85 (50)	985	Paracel Islands, Hainan, South China, Vietnam, Laos	$56.3 million	27	

=== August ===
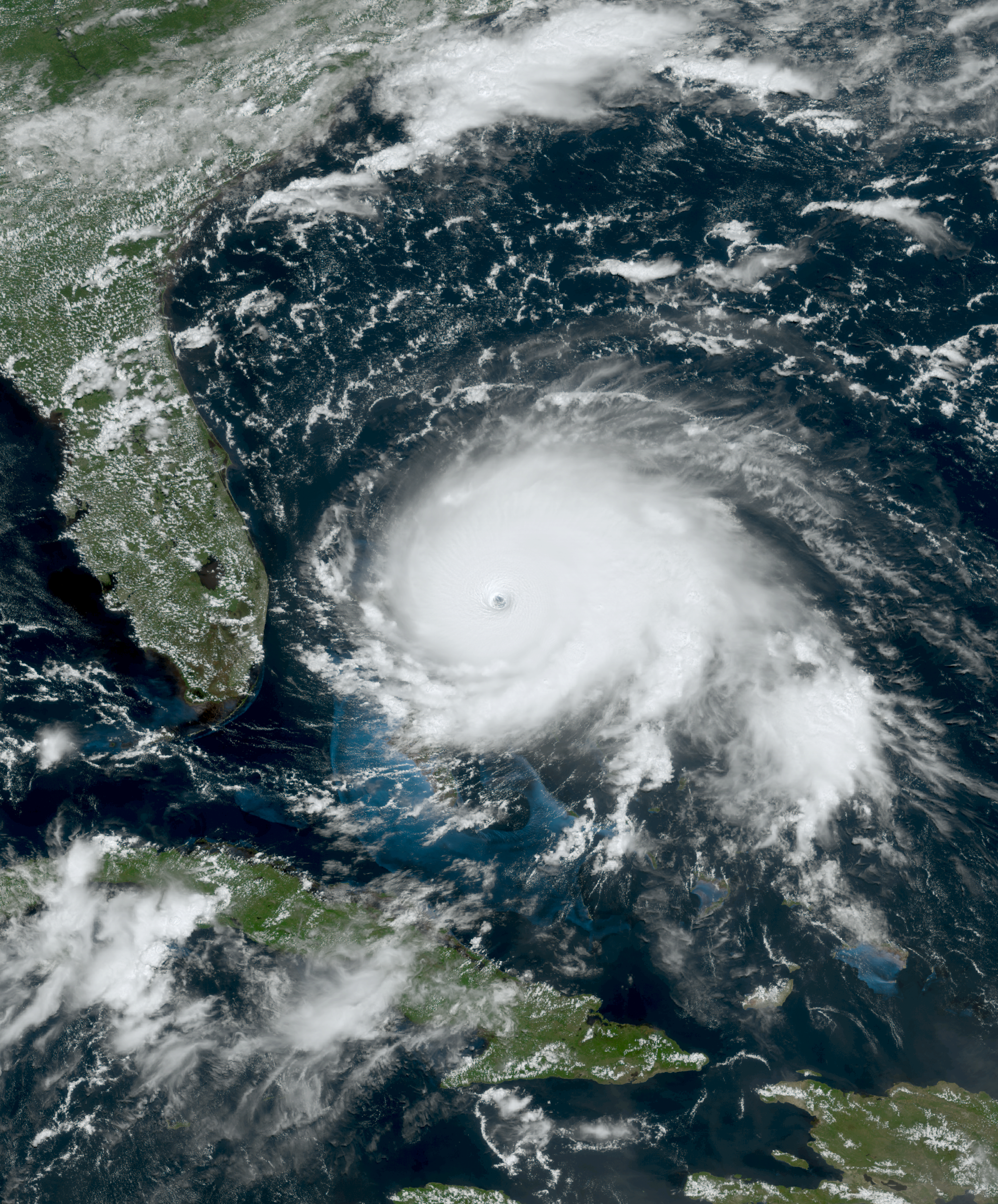
Hurricane Dorian

The month of August was the second-most active of the year with eighteen tropical cyclones forming, with fourteen being named, out of all the cyclones, Hurricane Dorian in the Atlantic was the strongest to form and the second deadliest of the month, with 84 confirmed deaths, and Typhoon Lekima became the second most costliest storm in Chinese history (behind Typhoon Fitow of 2013), as well as the deadliest storm of the month, with 105 fatalities.

Storm name	Dates active	Max wind km/h (mph)	Pressure (hPa)	Areas affected	Damage (USD)	Deaths	Refs
Francisco	August 1–7	130 (80)	970	Japan, Korean Peninsula	Unknown	2	
Lekima (Hanna)	August 2–14	195 (120)	925	Caroline Islands, Philippines, Ryukyu Islands, Taiwan, China, Korean Peninsula, Russian Far East	$9.28 billion	105	
Gil	August 3–5	65 (40)	1006	None	None	None	
Krosa	August 5–16	155 (100)	950	Mariana Islands, Japan, Korean Peninsula, Russian Far East	$20.3 million	3	
BOB 03	August 6–11	55 (35)	988	East India, Bangladesh	Unknown	3	
TD	August 6–8	55 (35)	996	Philippines	None	None	
Henriette	August 12–13	70 (45)	1005	Central America, Southwestern Mexico, Revillagigedo Islands, Baja California Peninsula	None	None	
TD	August 17–18	Unspecified	1006	None	None	None	
TD	August 19–21	Unspecified	1004	Ryukyu Islands, Taiwan, East China	None	None	
Bailu (Ineng)	August 20–27	95 (60)	985	Philippines, Taiwan, South China	$28.2 million	3	
Chantal	August 21–24	65 (40)	1009	Southeastern United States	None	None	
Ivo	August 21–25	100 (65)	992	Revillagigedo Islands, Baja California Peninsula, Northwestern Mexico	None	None	
Dorian	August 24 – September 12	295 (185)	910	Leeward Islands, Barbados, Virgin Islands, Puerto Rico, The Bahamas, Southeastern United States. Atlantic Canada,	$5.1 billion	84	
Podul (Jenny)	August 25–31	85 (50)	992	Yap, Philippines, Vietnam, Laos, Thailand, Cambodia	$2.35 million	16	
Erin	August 26–29	65 (40)	1005	Eastern United States	Minimal	None	
Faxai	August 30 – September 10	155 (100)	955	Wake Island, Japan	$10 billion	3	
Kajiki (Kabayan)	August 30 – September 7	65 (45)	996	Philippines, South China, Vietnam, Laos	$12.9 million	6	
Lingling (Liwayway)	August 31 – September 7	165 (105)	940	Philippines, Ryukyu Islands	$236 million	8	

=== September ===
Hurricane Lorenzo

The month of September was the most active of the year with twenty-five tropical cyclones forming, with seventeen being named. Out of all the cyclones, Hurricane Lorenzo in the Atlantic is the most intense of the month and become one of the largest and most powerful category 5 hurricanes on record for the central tropical Atlantic in the satellite era. Tropical Storm Fernand caused heavy flooding in Northwest Mexico, killing one person and causing at least $213 million in damage. The activity of the month in the Eastern Pacific became a record-tying most active in the month between 1966, 1992, 1994, 1997 and 2005 forming six named storms in the basin. Severe Tropical Storm (later Typhoon) Tapah (Nimfa) worsened the flooding situation in the Philippines. No tropical cyclones were formed in South Atlantic.

Storm name	Dates active	Max wind km/h (mph)	Pressure (hPa)	Areas affected	Damage (USD)	Deaths	Refs
Juliette	September 1–7	205 (125)	953	None	None	None	
TD	September 1–4	55 (35)	998	Philippines	None	None	
Fernand	September 3–5	85 (50)	1000	Northwestern Mexico, Southern Texas	$383 million	1	
Gabrielle	September 3–10	100 (65)	995	Cape Verde, British Isles	None	None	
Akoni	September 4–6	65 (40)	1004	None	None	None	
TD	September 4–5	Unspecified	1006	Caroline Islands	None	None	
TD	September 7–10	55 (35)	1000	Ryukyu Islands	None	None	
Marilyn	September 7–10	55 (35)	998	Caroline Islands, Philippines	None	None	
Kiko	September 12–25	215 (130)	950	None	None	None	
Humberto	September 13–20	205 (125)	951	Hispaniola, Cuba, Bahamas, Southeastern United States, Bermuda	25 million	1	
Peipah	September 13–16	65 (40)	1000	Mariana Islands	None	None	
TD	September 15	Unspecified	996	None	None	None	
TD	September 17–20	Unspecified	1000	None	None	None	
Tapah (Nimfa)	September 17–23	120 (75)	970	Philippines	None	None	
Lorena	September 17–22	140 (85)	987	Southwestern Mexico, Western Mexico, Revillagigedo Islands, Baja California Peninsula	None	None	
Mario	September 17–23	100 (65)	992	None	None	None	
Jerry	September 17–25	165 (105)	971	Leeward Islands, Puerto Rico	None	None	
Imelda	September 17–21	75 (45)	1003	Southwestern United States, Texas, Louisiana, Oklahoma, Arkansas	$5 billion	5	
TD	September 17	Unspecified	1004	Philippines	None	None	
Karen	September 22–27	75 (45)	1002	Windward Islands, Trinidad and Tobago, Venezuela, U.S. Virgin Islands, British Virgin Islands, Puerto Rico	$3.5 million	None	
Hikaa	September 22–26	140 (85)	978	Gujarat, Oman	None	None	
Lorenzo	September 23 – October 2	260 (160)	925	West Africa, Cape Verde, Eastern United States, Azores, British Isles, France	≥$362 million	19	
Mitag (Onyok)	September 25 – October 3	140 (85)	965	Mariana Islands, Taiwan, Japan, East China, South Korea	None	None	
Narda	September 28 – October 1	(85) 50	998	Western Mexico, Southwestern Mexico	None	None	
Land 01	September 29 – October 1	Unspecified	Unspecified	Gujarat	None	None	

=== October ===
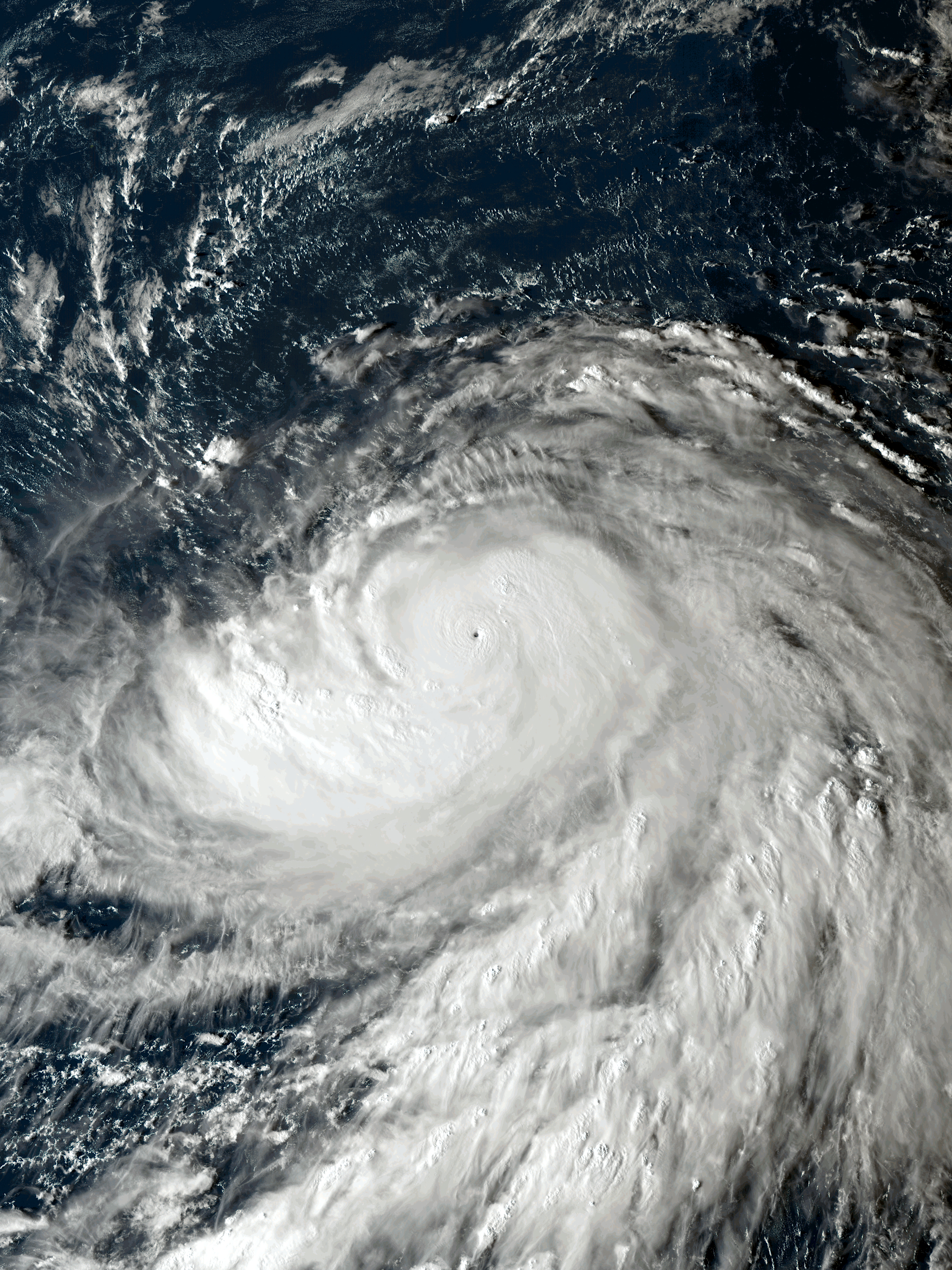
Typhoon Hagibis

The month of October was fairly active, with formation of Typhoon Hagibis, made landfall in Tokyo, Japan, becoming the worst typhoon in Japanese history since Ida in 1958. Hurricane Pablo became the easternmost Atlantic storm to ever strengthen into a hurricane, breaking Hurricane Vince's record. Tropical Storm Matmo and Cyclone Bulbul was a pair of very damaging tropical cyclones. Matmo caused extensive damage in Vietnam during the end period of the month October, with damage US$165 million. Bulbul caused extensive damage in West Bengal during the early period of the month November, with damage US$3.37 billion.

Storm name	Dates active	Max wind km/h (mph)	Pressure (hPa)	Areas affected	Damage (USD)	Deaths	Refs
TD	October 1–3	Unknown	1010	None	None	None	
Hagibis	October 4–13	195 (120)	915	Mariana Islands, South Korea, Japan, Russian Far East	$15 billion	95	
Melissa	October 11–14	100 (65)	995	Mid-Atlantic States, New England, Nova Scotia,	None	None	
Ema	October 12–14	85 (50)	1003	None	None	None	
Fifteen	October 14–16	55 (35)	1006	West Africa, Cape Verde	None	None	
Neoguri (Perla)	October 15–21	140 (85)	992	None	None	None	
Octave	October 17–19	75 (45)	1004	None	None	None	
Bualoi	October 18–25	185 (115)	935	Caroline Islands, Mariana Islands, Japan	$200 million	13	
Nestor	October 18–19	95 (60)	996	Central America, Mexico, Southeastern United States	>$150 million	0 (3)	
Priscilla	October 20–21	65 (40)	1004	Western Mexico	>$3 million	None	
Kyarr	October 24 – November 1	240 (150)	922	Gujarat, Iran, Pakistan, Oman	None	None	
Scott	October 24–26	75 (45)	1004	Egypt, Israel	Unknown	None	
Olga	October 25–26	65 (40)	998	United States Gulf Coast	>$100 million	1	
Pablo	October 25–28	130 (80)	977	Azores	None	None	
Matmo	October 28–31	95 (60)	992	Vietnam, Laos, Cambodia, Thailand	$39.4 million	2	
Maha	October 30 – November 7	185 (115)	956	India	None	None	
Rebekah	October 30 – November 1	75 (45)	987	Azores	None	None	

=== November ===
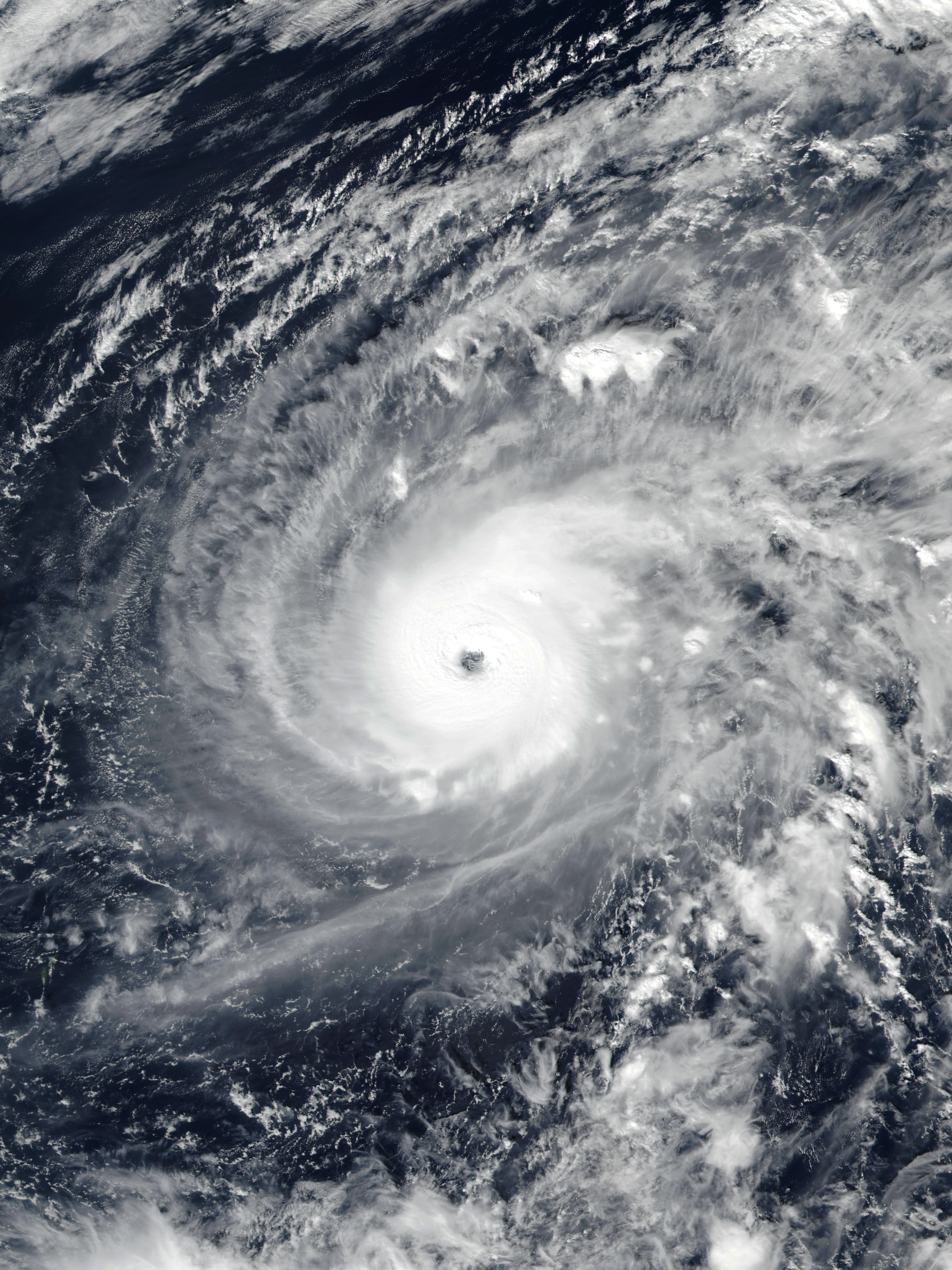
Typhoon Halong

The month of November was slightly inactive, with only nine tropical cyclones forming. However, Typhoon Halong became the strongest storm of the year, peaking with a minimum central pressure of 905 millibars.Typhoon Nakri, far earlier in the month, and Typhoon Kammuri, near the end of the month, both lashed parts of the Philippines with heavy rainfall and strong wind, killing 34 people in the country in total. Additionally, Tropical Cyclone Rita became the first cyclone of the 2019–20 South Pacific cyclone season.

Storm name	Dates active	Max wind km/h (mph)	Pressure (hPa)	Areas affected	Damage (USD)	Deaths	Refs
Halong	November 2–9	215 (130)	905	None	None	None	
Nakri (Quiel)	November 4–11	120 (75)	980	Philippines	>$40 million	22	
Bulbul	October 28–31	140 (85)	976	Myanmar, Andaman and Nicobar Islands, Eastern India, Bangladesh	$3.37 billion	41	
Trudy (Detlef)	November 10–11	80 (50)	998	Algeria, Spain, Italy	Unknown	1	
Fengshen	November 10–18	155 (100)	965	Marshall Islands, Northern Mariana Islands	None	None	
Kalmaegi (Ramon)	November 11–21	120 (75)	980	Philippines	None	None	
Raymond	November 15–17	85 (50)	1000	Revillagigedo Islands, Baja California Peninsula	None	None	
Twenty-One-E	November 16–18	55 (35)	1006	Southwest Mexico	None	None	
Fung-wong (Sarah)	November 19–24	100 (65)	990	Philippines	None	None	
Sebastien	November 19–25	100 (65)	994	Leeward Islands	None	None	
TD	November 22–23	—N/a	1010	None	None	None	
Rita	November 22–27	120 (75)	978	Solomon Islands, Vanuatu	None	None	
Kammuri (Tisoy)	November 24 – December 6	165 (105)	950	Caroline Islands, Mariana Islands, Philippines	$116 million	12	
TD	November 26–29	55 (35)	1002	Mariana Islands	None	None	
TD	November 29 – December 1	55 (35)	1002	Caroline Islands	None	None	

=== December ===
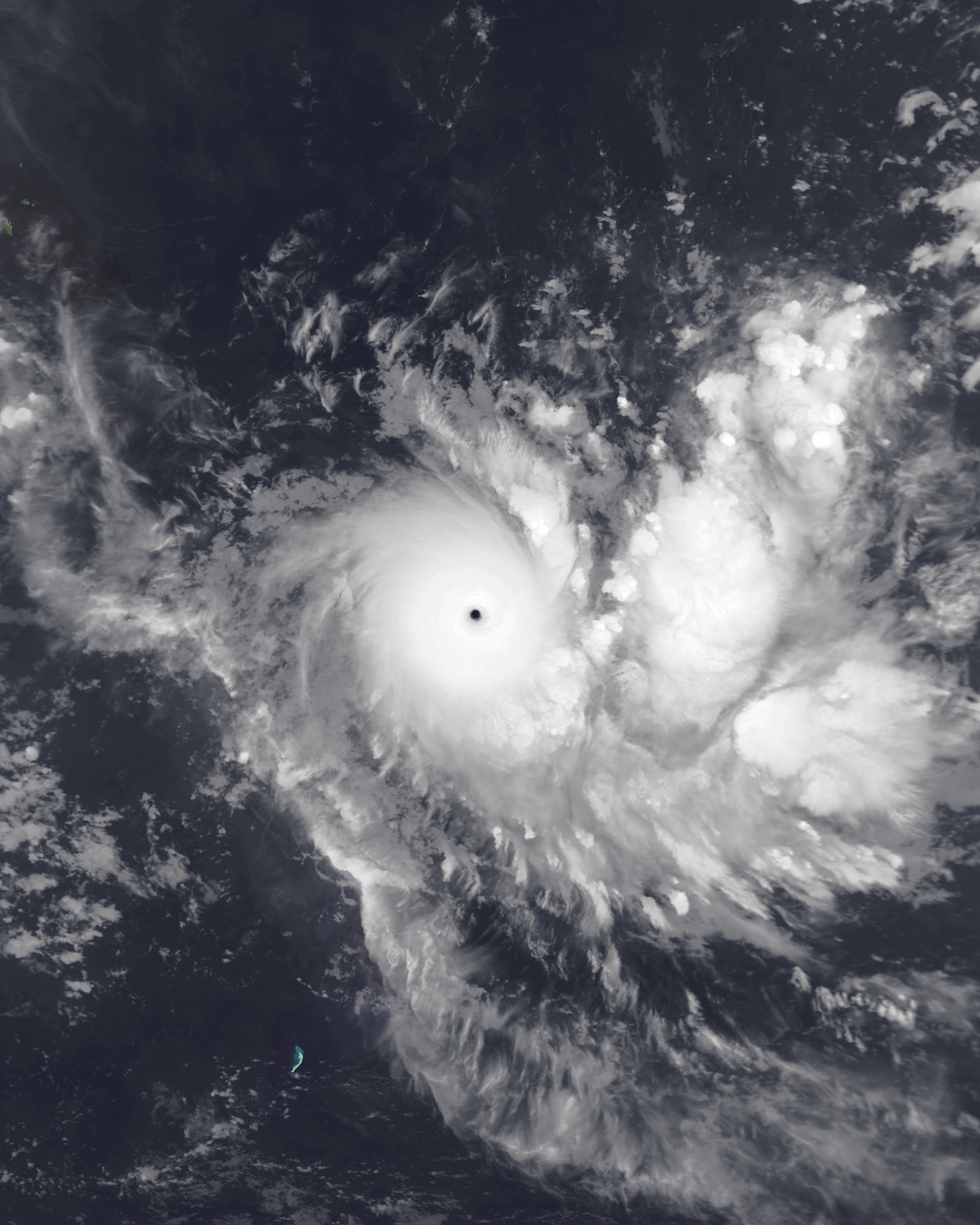
Cyclone Ambali

The month of December was only slightly active, with nine tropical cyclones forming but only six tropical cyclones being named. However, Ambali became the strongest storm of the month, peaking with a minimum central pressure of 930 millibars and maximum sustained winds of 160 miles per hour (260 km/h), thus becoming the first very intense tropical cyclone and Category 5 in the Saffir-Simpson Hurricane Wind Scale in the basin since Fantala in 2016 while also becoming the first named cyclone of the 2019–20 South-West Indian Ocean cyclone season. Adding to the season, Cyclone Belna formed and made a destructive landfall in northwestern Madagascar, killing 9 people. Additionally, before becoming the last typhoon of the 2019 Pacific typhoon season, Typhoon Phanfone made a devastating landfall in the Philippines on Christmas Eve causing over ₱3,39 billion (US$67.2 million) in damage and leaving 50 people in the nation dead.

Storm name	Dates active	Max wind km/h (mph)	Pressure (hPa)	Areas affected	Damage (USD)	Deaths	Refs
Belna	December 2–11	185 (115)	955	Seychelles, Mayotte, Comoros, Madagascar	> $25 million	9	
Pawan	December 2–7	75 (45)	998	Somalia	Unknown	6	
ARB 07	December 3–5	55 (60)	1002	Tamil Nadu	Unknown	25	
Ambali	December 3–8	220 (140)	930	None	None	None	
ARB 08	December 8–10	55 (35)	1004	Socotra, Somalia	None	None	
02F	December 19–23	Unknown	999	None	None	None	
Phanfone (Ursula)	December 19–29	175 (110)	970	Caroline Islands, Philippines	$67.2 million	50	
Sarai	December 23 – January 2, 2020	110 (70)	972	Fiji, Tonga, Niue, Southern Cook Islands	$2.3 million	2	
Calvinia	December 27 – January 1, 2020	120 (75)	973	Mauritius, Rodrigues	Unknown	None	

== Global effects ==
Season name		Areas affected	Systems formed	Named storms	Damage (USD)	Deaths	Ref
North Atlantic Ocean (Note: The wind speeds for this tropical cyclone/basin are based on the Saffir Simpson Scale which uses 1-minute sustained winds.)		Bermuda, Midwestern United States, Southeastern United States, Gulf Coast of the United States, Arkansas, Oklahoma, Great Lakes region, Atlantic Canada, Northeastern United States, Bahamas, Cape Verde, Azores	20	18	$11.59 billion	121	
Eastern and Central Pacific Ocean		Central America, Panama, Costa Rica, Nicaragua, Hawaii, Hawaiian Islands, Johnston Atoll, Southwestern Mexico, Clarion Island, Western Mexico, Baja California Peninsula, Northwestern Mexico, Southwestern United States, Texas	21	19	$66.1 million	12	
Western Pacific Ocean (Note: Only systems that formed either before or on December 31, 2023 are counted in the seasonal totals.)		Natuna Islands, Vietnam, Malaysia, Thailand, Myanmar, Kiribati, Marshall Islands, Caroline Islands, Palau, Philippines, Guam, Federated States of Micronesia, Mariana Islands, Yap Islands, Taiwan, Ryukyu Islands, East China, Japan, Korean Peninsula, North China, Russian Far East, Western Alaska, Arctic Ocean, Kuril Islands, Bonin Islands, Laos,	50	29	$38.96 billion	453	
North Indian Ocean (Note: The wind speeds for this tropical cyclone/basin are based on the IMD Scale which uses 3-minute sustained winds.)		Thailand, Myanmar, Andaman Islands, Sumatra, Nicobar Islands, Sri Lanka, East India, Bangladesh, Bhutan, Maldives, Gujarat, Saudi Arabia, Iran, Pakistan, Oman, Somalia	11	7	$11.63 billion	185	
South-West Indian Ocean	January – June (Note: Only systems that formed either on or after January 1, 2023 are counted in the seasonal totals.) (Note: The wind speeds for this tropical cyclone are based on Météo-France, which uses wind gusts.)	Tanzania, Madagascar, Rodrigues, Mauritius, Mozambique, Malawi, Zimbabwe, Seychelles, Comoros	9	9	>$3,646 billion	1,672	
South-West Indian Ocean	July – December	Seychelles, Mayotte, Comoros, Madagascar, Mauritius, Rodrigues	4	3	$25 million	41	
Australian region	January – June	Solomon Islands, Western Australia, Queensland, New South Wales, Maluku Islands, East Timor, Java, Christmas Island, Cocos Islands, Papua New Guinea, Western Australia, Sumatra, Eastern Indonesia, Top End, Northern Kimberley, New Caledonia	13	7	$1.68 billion	14	
Australian region	July – December	—N/a	—N/a	—N/a	—N/a	—N/a	
South Pacific Ocean	January – June	Solomon Islands, Fiji, Wallis and Futuna, Samoan Islands, Tonga, Vanuatu, New Caledonia	9	4	$50 million	None	
South Pacific Ocean	July – December	Solomon Islands, Vanuatu, Fiji, Lau islands, Tonga	3	2	$2.3 million	2	
South Atlantic Ocean		Rio de Janeiro	2	2	Unknown	—N/a	
Worldwide		(See above)	142 (Note: The sum of the number of systems in each basin will not equal the number shown as the total. This is because when systems move between basins, it creates a discrepancy in the actual number of systems.)	100	$67.64 billion	2,500	

== See also ==
- Tropical cyclones by year
- List of earthquakes in 2019
- Tornadoes of 2019
- 2019 wildfire season

== Notes ==
^{1} Only systems that formed either on or after January 1, 2019 are counted in the seasonal totals.
^{2} Only systems that formed either before or on December 31, 2019 are counted in the seasonal totals.
^{3} The wind speeds for this tropical cyclone/basin are based on the IMD Scale which uses 3-minute sustained winds.
^{4} The wind speeds for this tropical cyclone/basin are based on the Saffir Simpson Scale which uses 1-minute sustained winds.
^{5}The wind speeds for this tropical cyclone are based on Météo-France which uses gust winds.
