= Tropical cyclones in Indonesia =

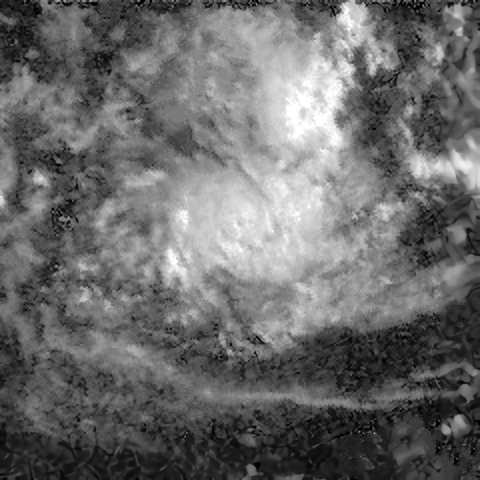
1973 Flores cyclone, the deadliest tropical cyclone ever recorded in both Indonesia and the entire Southern Hemisphere

Indonesia is an island country in Southeast Asia and Oceania, located in the Pacific Ocean and the Indian Ocean. The largest island nation in the world, the country is the home of over seventeen thousand islands.

Climatologically, in the Australian basin, most tropical cyclones develop between November and April, or as early as October and as late as May. However, there are some cases, most notably Typhoon Vamei, Cyclone Viyaru and Cyclone Senyar, where a tropical cyclone affected the nation from the north in either the Western Pacific or North Indian basins. This article includes all tropical cyclones of any intensity that affected the island nation of Indonesia, on all available records and data.

== Climatology ==
The region of Indonesia is not generally traversed by tropical cyclones although a lot of systems have historically formed there. In an analysis of tropical cyclone data from the Bureau of Meteorology since 1907 to 2017 which was published after the dissipation of Cyclone Cempaka found that only around 0.62% of all cyclones in the Australian region during those years occurred north of the 10th parallel south.

=== Statistics ===
Storms affecting Indonesia by month
Month	Number of storms
January	6
February	3
March	15
April	21
May	6
June	0
July	0
August	0
September	0
October	1
November	8
December	18

Storms affecting Indonesia by period
Period	Number of storms
1970s	20
1980s	16
1990s	13
2000s	6
2010s	22
2020s	2

== 1970s ==
- Cyclone Beverley
- Cyclone Sally
- Cyclone Vicky
- Cyclone Flores
- Cyclone Beryl
- Cyclone Jessie
- Cyclone Jenny
- Cyclone Norah
- Cyclone Selma
- Cyclone Wilma
- Cyclone Ray
- Cyclone Joan
- Cyclone Sue
- Cyclone Linda
- Cyclone Irene
- Cyclone Verna
- Cyclone Trudy
- Cyclone Brenda
- Cyclone Dean
- Cyclone Doris

== 1980s ==
- Cyclone Alice
- Cyclone Carol
- Cyclone Felix
- Cyclone Max
- Cyclone Amelia
- Cyclone Lena
- Cyclone Esther
- Cyclone 06U
- Cyclone Willy
- Cyclone Emma
- Cyclone Kirsty
- Cyclone Lindsay
- Cyclone Nicholas
- Cyclone John
- Cyclone Orson
- Cyclone Vincent

== 1990s ==
- Cyclone Errol
- Cyclone Marian
- Cyclone Neville
- Cyclone Sharon
- Cyclone Vivienne
- Cyclone Annette
- Cyclone Chloe
- Cyclone Olivia
- Cyclone Nicholas
- Cyclone Thelma
- Cyclone Gwenda
- Cyclone John
- Cyclone Rosita

== 2000s ==
- December 28, 2001 – Tropical Depression Vamei crossed through Sumatra before moving out to the Bay of Bengal.
- November 17–22, 2001 – On November 17, a tropical depression formed near southern Papua New Guinea. By the 19th conditions were less favorable, and the JTWC indicated that convection was sheared to the west of the well-defined, yet weak, circulation center. Up to this point, Darwin and JTWC were in agreement regarding the system's strength and its potential for development. However, JTWC issued their first Tropical Cyclone Formation Alert on 21 November, placing the system's center about 200 nm east-northeast of Timor. At 0600 UTC they upgraded the low to a weak tropical cyclone and issued their first warning. JTWC forecast slight strengthening which did not materialize. They issued their second and final warning at 1800 UTC. In their final best track, JTWC held the estimated tropical cyclone-strength intensity through the next day. Though the system was overland for some time, the damage it caused is unknown.
- April 9–14, 2002 – Bonnie caused heavy rainfall and gusty winds in Timor and Sumba. Flash flooding in Sumba killed 19 people.
- April 1–5, 2003 – The precursor tropical disturbance of Inigo dropped heavy rainfall in eastern Indonesia; on the island of Flores, Larantuka recorded 223 mm (8.78 in) in a 24-hour period. The rainfall caused flash flooding and mudslides, primarily in Flores but also on West Timor and Sumba. In some locations, the depth of the floodwaters reached 5 meters (16 ft). The Oessao River in West Timor exceeded its banks, which flooded seven villages. In Kupang in West Timor, the system destroyed hundreds of homes and large fields of corn, bean, and rice crop. Heavy damage was reported near Ende, where flooding and mudslides destroyed 20 houses and destroyed the roads connecting to East Flores. In Ende, a total of 294 animals were killed. The city's airport was flooded with one meter (3 ft) of water, preventing aerial transportation and leaving the city temporarily isolated. In East Flores Regency in eastern Flores Island, the system left 75 destroyed houses, along with 77 severely damaged and a further 56 receiving light damage. Damage in Indonesia totalled less than $6 million (2003 USD, $6.8 million 2007 USD), and 102 injuries were reported. The Indonesian representative to the Tropical Cyclone Committee of the World Meteorological Organization in 2004 reported the death toll related to the disaster in Indonesia as 58 fatalities.
- December 2–3, 2004 – A tropical low formed near the coast of Java. However, the impacts of this system, are unknown.
- April 18 – May 1 – The precursor to Kirrily formed near the Tanimbar Islands. Over the next week, the low remained weak as it moved towards the eastwards, before it turned towards the northwest during 25 April. JTWC reported the system's chances forming into a significant Tropical Cyclone within 24 hours as "poor". Later on 26 April, JTWC upgraded the low's chances of forming from "poor" to "fair" and later in the afternoon the low strengthened with JTWC upgrading the low from "fair" to "good" and issued a Tropical Cyclone Formation Alert. Joint Typhoon Warning Center designated the system as Tropical Cyclone 27S later on 27 April. In the afternoon, TCWC Darwin upgraded 23U to a Category 1 tropical cyclone and designated it as Tropical Cyclone Kirrily. Later that day, as it made landfall over Aru Islands, the low weakened slightly and JTWC downgraded Kirrily to a tropical depression, and TCWC Darwin downgraded Kirrily to a tropical low. In the afternoon of the 27th, the JTWC again upgraded Kirrily into a tropical storm. On 28 April the JTWC issued their final warning on Kirrily before the BoM downgraded the storm to a tropical low.

== 2010s ==
- April 12–15, 2011 – Tropical Low 29U formed in the Savu Sea on April 12, where it subsequently made landfall in West Timor on that day, before moving ashore and strengthening to Cyclone Errol while moving away from the region.
- April 16–23, 2012 – a weak tropical low formed near East Timor and passed through the western part of the island, where it further weakened and dissipated on April 23. It was unknown if the low had any significant impacts on land.
- May 7–14, 2012 – a tropical depression formed in the Banda Sea, where it slowly organized while passing through some Indonesian islands. However, it didn't organized further and remained in that intensity until it started to weaken before dissipating on May 14. However, it was unknown if the depression had impacts on land.
- January 4–8, 2013 – On 9 January, the MV Emeline cargo vessel sank off the coast of Selayar Islands due to high seas from Cyclone Narelle. Of the 17 crewmen, 6 were rescued and 11 others remained missing as of 16 January. Another vessel, the MV Angle, became stranded near West Lombok Regency. By 10 January, Narelle brought strong winds, heavy rains, and rough seas to the province of Bali in Indonesia. Residents and tourists were warned of waves up to 5 m (16 ft). Ferry service between Bali, West Nusa Tenggara, and Java was suspended, isolating residents in Nusa Penida, Nusa Lembongan, and Nusa Ceningan. Winds from the storm downed many trees and caused severe damage to structures across Bali, especially in the capital city of Denpasar. In Selemadeg Village, one person died after a tree fell on her. Trees and billboards were downed across Jakarta, and three homes were damaged. Flooding in the region closed several roads, leading to traffic delays more than 6 km (3.7 mi) long. In Banten, heavy rains caused four major rivers in the province to overflow their banks, leading to flooding in 33 districts. A total of 10,470 homes across the province were inundated, and four people were killed. In all, 14 people were killed and 6 others were listed as missing.
- May 8–11, 2013 – Parts of northwestern Indonesia were impacted early as Viyaru develops. Parts of northwestern Indonesia were impacted early on in the storm's existence. Five days of heavy rain in Aceh resulted in flash floods, forcing thousands of people to flee. One individual died after being hit by a falling tree in Simeulue Regency, and another went missing after his motorboat sank offshore. On May 9, twenty-two fishermen went missing after sailing into a storm; however, ten were quickly rescued. By May 18, another had been discovered in a nearby area, and the remaining eleven were presumed dead. Flooding occurred in six districts across Aceh due to torrential rains. Waters reached a depth of 2.5 meters in some areas (8.2 ft) and the floods impacted nearly 30,000 people. Eight passengers in a bus were killed due to an accident.
- March 17–21, 2014 – Across Java, Indonesia, Tropical Low Gillian produced moderate to heavy rains. After re-intensifying into a tropical cyclone, swells of 3 to 5 m (9.8 to 16.4 ft) from the storm affected the southern shores of the island. Though well to the north of Cyclone Gillian, the system's circulation drew moisture away from Riau, Western Indonesia, leaving behind fire-prone conditions. Due in part to illegal logging and slash-and-burn land clearing, several new forest fires began by 23 March.
- April 21 – May 1, 2017 – a tropical low formed in the Timor Sea on April 21, becoming Frances in the meantime. It neared the West Timor on April 28, before weakening to a tropical low on the same day. The developing low brought squally rainfall to the Maluku Islands, Tanimbar Islands, and the nearby areas on April 26.

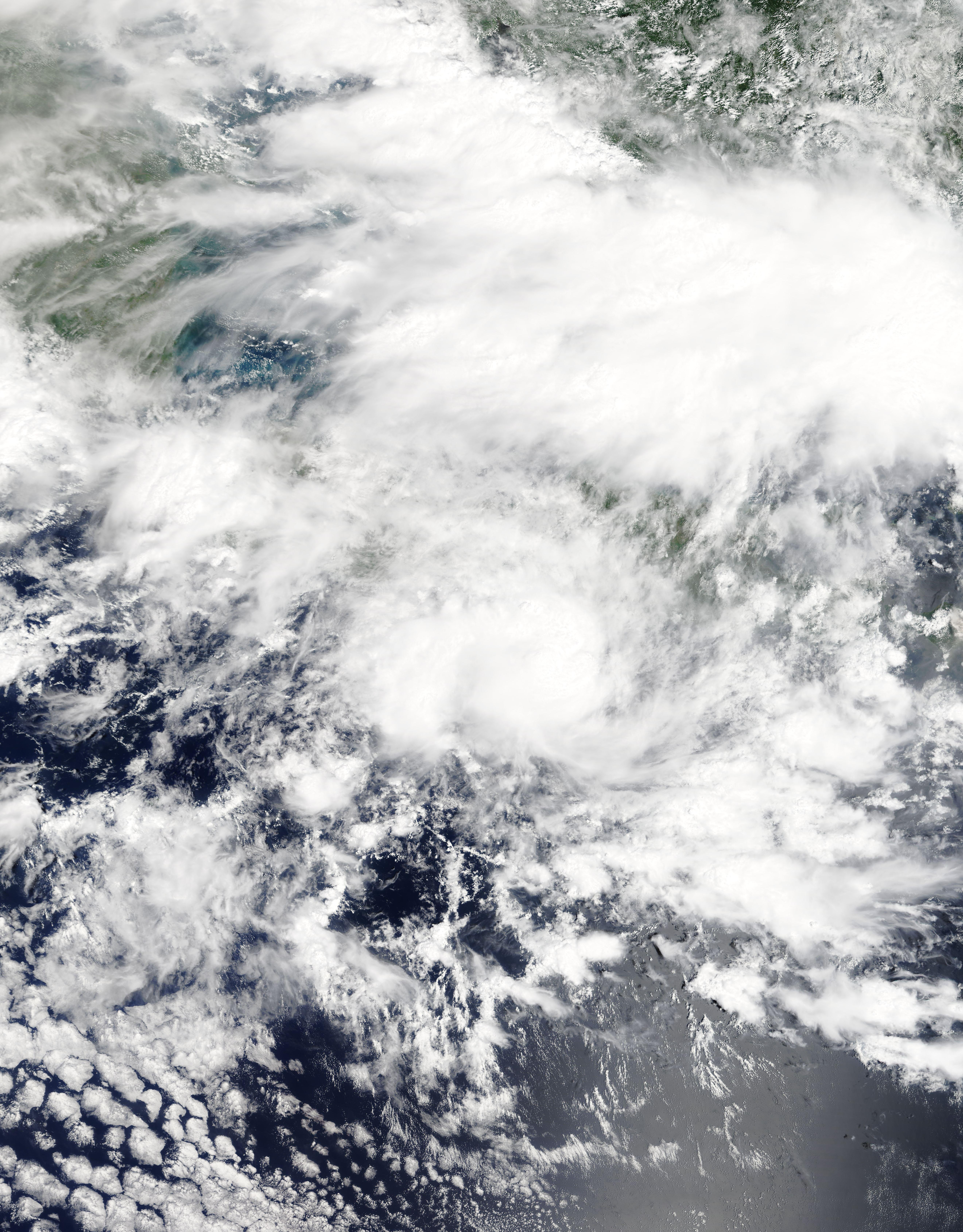
Cyclone Cempaka, just stalling offshore East Java at peak intensity on November 27, 2017.

- November 22 – December 1, 2017 – Despite the fact that Cyclone Cempaka never made landfall, the rain it brought caused significant flooding and landslides in 28 regencies and cities across Java, mostly in the south. In addition, tornadoes were confirmed in the state. On November 27, Pacitan received 383 mm (15.1 in) of rain, while Yogyakarta received 286 mm (11.3 in), both of which are considered "extreme" amounts of daily rainfall by BMKG. Yogyakarta's government declared a state of emergency on November 29. According to the Indonesian National Board for Disaster Management, 41 people had died and over 14,000 people had been evacuated in Central Java, East Java, and Yogyakarta as of November 30. Damages were estimated at US$83.6 million.
- November 26–29, 2017 – Tropical Low 03U formed in the Banda Sea, bringing squally weather near the Maluku Islands.
- November 26 – December 4, 2017 – Cyclone Dahlia formed near Java, prompting the TCWC Jakarta to issue an extreme weather warning to the island. Squally rainfall were experienced, but the heaviest rain and winds from the cyclone weren't encountered. Flash floods and landslides were reported, but the damages and deaths were unknown.
- March 14, 2018 – a developing tropical low passed near the Tanimbar Islands, bringing squally weather. The low would eventually be Marcus before affecting the Northern Territory.
- March 19–20, 2018 – a tropical low formed near the Aru Islands. Moving to the southeast, the low developed to a tropical cyclone in the Gulf of Carpentaria, naming it Nora.
- November 14–18, 2018 – a weak tropical low affected the Indonesian island of Java and the nearby Christmas Island.
- March 6–15, 2019 – a weak tropical low formed in the Banda Sea, near the Maluku Islands. The damages and deaths, if any, we're unknown.
- March 8–11, 2019 – Savannah, as a tropical low, dumped a lot of rain on Java. In Surabaya, a five-year-old boy was killed in a car crash. Landslides in Yogyakarta took the lives of five people and left one missing. The worst flooding in Madiun in two decades caused damage of 54.1 billion rupiah (US$3.78 million). Four tourists were killed in Magelang when a river was overrun by flash floods. Flooding caused damage totaling 52.2 billion rupiah (US$3.65 million) in many East Java districts. Flood damage totaled 934 million rupiah (US$65,000) in Klaten and Sukoharjo, both in Central Java. Savannah also triggered floods in Bali, causing 150 million rupiah in damage in Sawan, Buleleng.
- April 6–8, 2019 – Cyclone Wallace brought rainfall, high waves, and gusty winds to parts of Indonesia, with sustained winds of 45 km/h (30 mph) recorded on East Nusa Tenggara.
- April 21–26, 2019 – an undesignated tropical low affected Sumatra and the Cocos Islands.
- May 4–11, 2019 – Lili's precursor tropical low tracked towards the south across the southern Banda Sea and brought the storm close to Maluku Islands before it developed into a tropical cyclone. The rainfall from the cyclone caused widespread flooding across the islands. Many houses and public utilities sustained damages, causing many residents to be displaced. The strong winds of Lili also generated dangerous seas, allegedly leading to the sinking of a ship.
- May 18, 2019 – The remnant tropical low of Cyclone Ann entered the Banda Sea and dissipated there shortly. The system brought cloudiness near the Maluku Islands.
- January 4–5, 2020 – A tropical low formed near the Maluku Islands, which brought squally rainfalls to the area, including the East Nusa Tenggara. As it moved to the southwest, the system would eventually become Claudia as it emerged over the waters near Kalumburu.
- May 5–6, 2020 – As a tropical depression formed near the country, the TCWC Jakarta issued an extreme weather warning for the southern Sumatra, western portion of Java, the Bangka Belitung Islands and the other nearby islands. The developing system also brought high surf, heavy downpours and squally winds to the area.
- May 21–22, 2020 – Eleven days later after the dissipation of the tropical depression that brought squally rainfall to the country, The TCWC Jakarta issued an extreme weather warning for the south-west coast of Sumatra and the westernmost part of Java, owing to the potentials from the tropical low, which would eventually become Mangga to cause moderate-to-heavy precipitation. In the Indian Ocean, wave heights were expected to exceed 6 m (20 ft) near the Mentawai Islands and the southwestern coasts of Sumatra and Java, as well as up to 4 m (13 ft) in the Sunda Strait and other regions.

== 2020s ==
- December 6–7, 2020 – Tropical Low 02U passed to the south of Java, bringing gale-force winds to the island.
- April 3–8, 2021 – The precursor to Cyclone Seroja caused various landslides and flash floods that killed over 160 in East Nusa Tenggara and the nearby East Timor.
- January 25-30, 2024- Cyclone Anggrek resulted in heavy rain, strong winds, flooding, fallen trees and landslides across Sumatra and Java islands.
- November 18–26, 2024 – Cyclone Robyn caused heavy flooding and landslides across western Sumatra, killing 40 people.
- November 25–27, 2025 – Cyclone Senyar caused heavy rainfall and landslides across northern Sumatra, killing at least 1,500 people, including 1,200 in Indonesia.

== Deadly storms ==
The following list is the recorded fatalities from the storms that impacted or affected the island country of Indonesia. The total number of deaths recorded is only from the country itself.

Rank	Name	Year	Number of Deaths
1	1973 Flores cyclone	1973	1,653
2	Cyclone Senyar	2025	1,200
3	Cyclone Seroja	2021	183
4	Cyclone Inigo	2003	58
5	Cyclone Cempaka	2017	41
6	Cyclone Robyn	2024	40
7	Cyclone Bonnie	2002	19
8	Cyclone Viyaru	2013	15
9	Cyclone Narelle	2013	14
10	Cyclone Savannah	2019	10

== See also ==
- List of Indonesia tornadoes
