= Pule (name) =

Pule is both a South African given name and surname.

== Given name ==
- Pule Isaac Bikitsha (1935–2015), South African politician and businessman
- Pule Lechesa (born 1976), South African author
- Pule Mabe (born 1980), South African politician
- Pule Maraisane (born 1995), South African football player
- Pule Mmodi (born 1993), South African soccer player
- Pule Shayi (born 1972), South African politician
- Pule Thole (fl. 2014–2016), South African advocate and brigadier
- Pule Tlaletsi (born 1960), South African judge

== Surname ==
- Bafitlhile Pule (born 1940), South African retired politician
- Boalefa Pule (born 1990), South African footballer
- Daniel Pule Kunene (1923–2016), South African literary scholar, translator, and writer
- Dina Pule (born 1960), South African politician
- Hermano Pule (1815–1841), Filipino religious leader
- Jabu Pule (born 1980), South African football player
- John Pule (born 1962), Niuean artist, novelist, and poet
- Katlego Pule (born 1990), South African football player
- Mabuse Pule, Botswanan politician and educator
- Tuiloma Pule Lameko (1935–2018). Samoan politician
- Vincent Pule (born 1992), South African football player

== See also ==
- Pule (disambiguation)
