= Cyclone Seroja =

Category 3 Australian region cyclone in 2021

Severe Tropical Cyclone Seroja
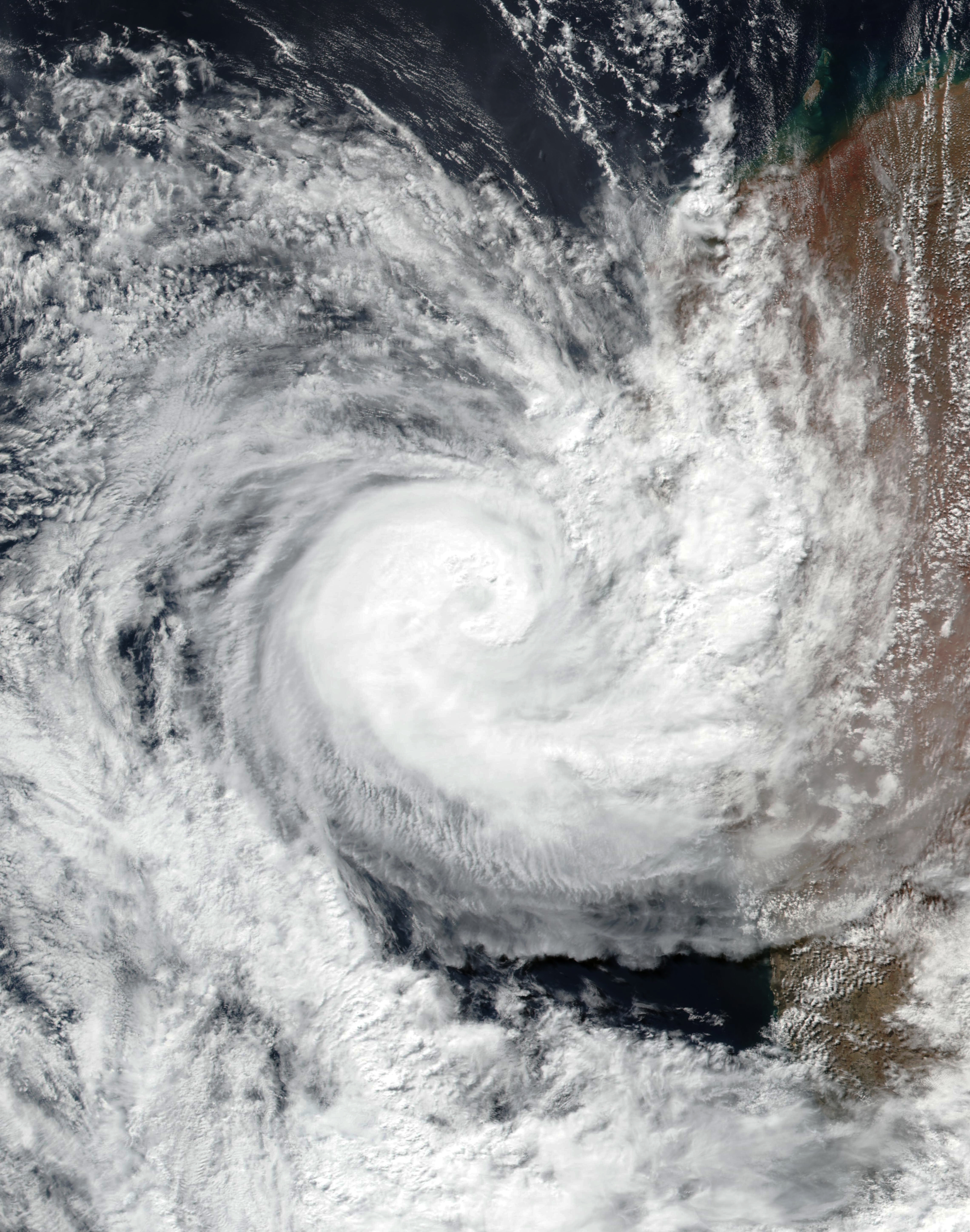
- Cyclone Seroja approaching Western Australia on 11 April

Meteorological history
- Formed: 3 April 2021
- Dissipated: 12 April 2021

Category 3 severe tropical cyclone
- 10-minute sustained (Aus)
- Highest winds: 120 km/h (75 mph)
- Highest gusts: 165 km/h (105 mph)
- Lowest pressure: 971 hPa (mbar); 28.67 inHg

Category 1-equivalent tropical cyclone
- 1-minute sustained (SSHWS/JTWC)
- Highest winds: 140 km/h (85 mph)
- Lowest pressure: 968 hPa (mbar); 28.59 inHg

Overall effects
- Fatalities: 272 (Third-deadliest tropical cyclone in the Australian region)
- Missing: 102
- Damage: >$491 million (2021 USD)
- Areas affected: Indonesia; Timor-Leste; Western Australia
- IBTrACS
- Part of the 2020–21 Australian region cyclone season

Severe Tropical Cyclone Seroja was the third-deadliest tropical cyclone on record in the Australian region, behind Cyclone Mahina in 1899 and the Flores cyclone in 1973. Seroja brought historic flooding and landslides to portions of southern Indonesia and Timor-Leste and later went on to make landfall in Western Australia's Mid West region, becoming the first to do so since Cyclone Elaine in 1999. The twenty-second tropical low, seventh tropical cyclone, and third severe tropical cyclone of the 2020–21 Australian region cyclone season, the precursor of Seroja formed off the south coast of Timor island as Tropical Low 22U at 18:00 UTC on 3 April 2021; its genesis was related to convectively coupled equatorial waves. The tropical low moved very slowly near the island, while the system's thunderstorms increased in organization. The low intensified into Tropical Cyclone Seroja by 4 April, while it was passing north of Rote Island, while continuing its slow strengthening trend.

Due to the presence of Tropical Cyclone Odette in Seroja's vicinity, interaction was anticipated as the storm moved away from Indonesia and Timor-Leste. Its intensity fluctuated as it moved southwest, with its strengthening being highly hindered due to interaction with Odette. This caused the system to weaken as Seroja moved closer to it, due to a phenomenon known as the Fujiwhara effect. Eventually, Seroja began to restrengthen and weaken Odette, with Seroja absorbing Odette into its circulation on 10 April. Due to Odette, Seroja was steered to the southeast towards Australia, before strengthening even further. At around 8 p.m. local time on 11 April, Seroja made landfall on the western coastline of Western Australia as a Category 3 severe tropical cyclone, slightly south of the coastal town of Kalbarri, bringing heavy rain and hurricane-force wind gusts (about 170 km/h, or 110 mph). Later that day, Seroja began accelerating southeastward while weakening. On 12 April, Seroja emerged off the southern coast of Western Australia while beginning to undergo an extratropical transition, before being absorbed into another larger extratropical cyclone to the south. The name Seroja means lotus in Indonesian.

As of May 2021, it is estimated that at least 272 people were killed by the storm, with 183 people in Indonesia, 42 in Timor-Leste, and one in Australia. At least 72 people from Indonesia and 30 from Timor-Leste are still missing. The cyclone damaged or destroyed more than 20,000 houses and five bridges in Indonesia's East Nusa Tenggara province while more than 12,000 people were evacuated to government-owned shelters. Around 9,000 people were displaced on Timor-Leste, while at least 10,000 homes have been submerged. Damage reports from Kalbarri started coming in soon after the storm made landfall. The storm is estimated to have caused over $490.7 million (2021 USD) in damages, a majority across Indonesia. The damage caused by Cyclone Seroja in Indonesia was described as catastrophic.

Efforts to relieve the devastating effects of the cyclone came a short time after Seroja left Indonesia. They included almost a million USD in donations, methods to help fight COVID-19, evacuations, local governments sending aid to their respective areas, and more. Timor-Leste also was given outside assistance from other organizations and nations. The Indonesian and Western Australian government's responses were criticized due to the slow nature of their respective responses; in the case of Indonesia, this resulted in some high-ranking officials being fired.

== Meteorological history ==
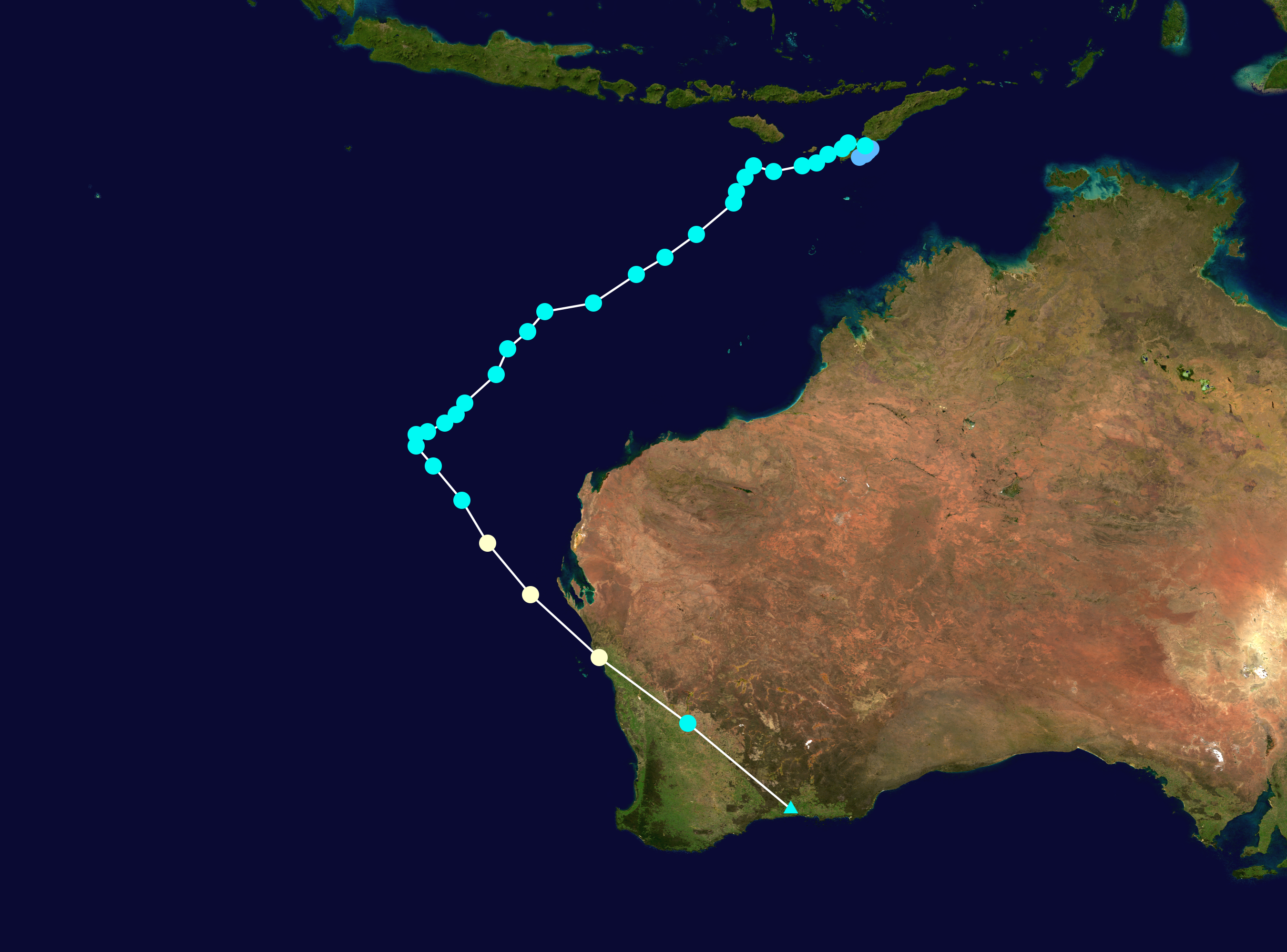
Map plotting the storm's track and intensity, according to the Saffir–Simpson scale Map key Saffir–Simpson scale Tropical depression (≤38 mph, ≤62 km/h) Tropical storm (39–73 mph, 63–118 km/h) Category 1 (74–95 mph, 119–153 km/h) Category 2 (96–110 mph, 154–177 km/h) Category 3 (111–129 mph, 178–208 km/h) Category 4 (130–156 mph, 209–251 km/h) Category 5 (≥157 mph, ≥252 km/h) Unknown Storm type Tropical cyclone Subtropical cyclone Extratropical cyclone, remnant low, tropical disturbance, or monsoon depression

On 29 March, the BoM began to mention that Tropical Low 22U was developing to the south of Timor. By 3 April, the tropical low fully developed as it was within an active trough. The low was located in a generally favorable environment with deep moisture, low vertical wind shear, and defined outflow. The low drifted close to the coast of Timor very slowly with persistent spiraling bands of convection occupying the storm's circulation, producing prolific rainfall in the surrounding regions on 3–4 April. At this time, the low pressure system was located inside the Area of Responsibility (AoR) of TCWC Jakarta. By the early morning of 4 April, the presentation of its structure had improved with spiral bands of deep convection and tight curvature at its center. Although there were fluctuations in central convection, a favorable environment of deep moisture, low vertical wind shear, and good outflow meant further development of the system was expected. Meanwhile, the Joint Typhoon Warning Center (JTWC) issued their first warning on the storm as Tropical Cyclone 26S at 15:00 on UTC 4 April. The tropical low slowly gained strength, intensifying to a Category 1 tropical cyclone, and was given the name Seroja by the Tropical Cyclone Warning Centre (TCWC) Jakarta at 20:00 UTC on 4 April, about 95 km (59 mi) north-northwest of Rote Island.

Tropical Cyclone Odette (left) and Tropical Cyclone Seroja (right) engaging in Fujiwhara interaction while intensifying between 7–9 April.

During 5 April, Seroja continued to move at 3 km/h (1.9 mph) in a west-southwest direction, away from the Indonesian coastline. The storm intensified to a Category 2 tropical cyclone at 19:00 UTC, with 10-minute sustained winds of 105 km/h (65 mph) and its central pressure deepening to 982 mb (29.00 inHg). Long term uncertainty in both track and intensity persisted in the forecasting of Seroja's track, due to interaction with Tropical Low 23U, to the far west of the storm. Seroja held this strength for roughly 12 hours, before unexpectedly weakening to a Category 1 tropical cyclone yet again on 6 April, due to southeasterly wind shear, and dry air partially exposing the low level circulation (LLC) and degrading its thunderstorm activity. Seroja fluctuated in strength for several hours, intensifying slightly on 7 April, as it continued in a generally southwesterly direction. Seroja became disorganized on satellite imagery as convection became dislocated to the south on 8 April, while it began to closely interact with Tropical Cyclone Odette (formerly Tropical Low 23U) just to the northwest, as a result of the Fujiwhara effect, complicating the forecasts for the tropical cyclone and causing it to weaken again. Seroja resumed intensification by the next day, re-intensifying into a Category 2 tropical cyclone at 13:16 UTC on 9 April, as the storm began to absorb Odette and as wind shear started to ease off. By 10 April, Seroja had absorbed most of Odette's remaining thunderstorms and began to accelerate to the southeast towards Western Australia, maintaining a relatively organized structure. Later that day, Seroja fully absorbed Odette into its circulation.

Seroja continued to steadily intensify as it approached the Gascoyne Region; the JTWC upgraded Seroja to a Category 1–equivalent tropical cyclone on the Saffir–Simpson scale, with sustained winds of 120 km/h (75 mph), at 18:00 UTC on 10 April. By early on 11 April, Seroja had intensified into a Category 3 severe tropical cyclone, the third severe tropical cyclone of the season, as a ragged eye began to emerge from the cyclone's central dense overcast. Seroja continued rapidly accelerating to the southeast at 53 km/h (33 mph), with its eye becoming more defined on infrared and Doppler weather radar images before making landfall near Gregory, Western Australia, or just north of Geraldton at peak strength with 1-minute sustained winds of 130 km/h (81 mph), 10-minute sustained winds of 120 km/h (75 mph), and a minimum central pressure of 971 hPa (28.76 inHg), with observations of gusts as high as 150 km/h (93 mph). Following landfall, Seroja quickly moved to the southeast over Australia, while gradually weakening. Early on 12 April, Seroja's extratropical remnant entered the Great Australian Bight, while beginning to transition into an extratropical cyclone, before being absorbed into a larger extratropical cyclone to the south later that day.

== Preparations ==
=== Indonesia ===
The Indonesian Meteorology, Climatology, and Geophysical Agency declared two days before the cyclone's formation that they were already anticipating the possibility of tropical cyclone development over the Savu Sea. On 4 April 2021, the agency issued an early warning. On 8 April 2021, the agency again issued warnings to other provinces such as Bali, East Java, Central Java, and West Nusa Tenggara.

=== Australia ===
The Australian Bureau of Meteorology (BOM) warned on 5 April 2021 that Seroja could approach the West Pilbara or Gascoyne coastline. It was also advised that tourists be ready to change plans, in case the cyclone impacts the area and brings unsafe conditions to go home. Due to the cyclone's uncertain track from its Fujiwhara interaction with Tropical Cyclone Odette, the chance of impacts on Western Australia was uncertain as to where it would go; out to sea or into land. As the storm approached Australia, the price of Australian commodities such as coals and iron ores were expected to rise. In addition, there was concern that it would disrupt or delay shipments and trades from the region. The BOM also issued a tropical cyclone watch early on 9 April for much of the region between Coral Bay and Lancelin.

Department of Fire and Emergency Services (DFES) Acting Commissioner Craig Waters advised all people in the watch area to 'leave immediately' as many of the homes in the area would be under significant risk with pre-saturated soil allowing flooding to likely occur much more easily. BOM also mentioned that this region was not accustomed to tropical cyclone impacts, making the risk of Seroja's impacts more dangerous than usual with a month's worth of rain expected to fall within a day. A tropical cyclone warning was then issued for Cape Cuvier to Geraldton on 10 April as Seroja neared, albeit strengthening slower than anticipated. All people between Coral Bay and Geraldton were eventually told to evacuate immediately on 11 April as homes were not built to withstand such high winds.

Premier Mark McGowan said that Seroja was "like nothing we have seen before in decades". There was a Red Alert placed along an 800 kilometer stretch of coastline south of Carnarvon and Lancelin. The people under the alert were required to stay in their houses or in an evacuation center. The latter structures were open in Port Denison, Carnarvon and Denham. The cyclone was expected to impact the area until midnight. High tides, intense rainfall, flash flooding, dangerous surf and beach erosion were among the warned dangers of Seroja.

== Impact ==
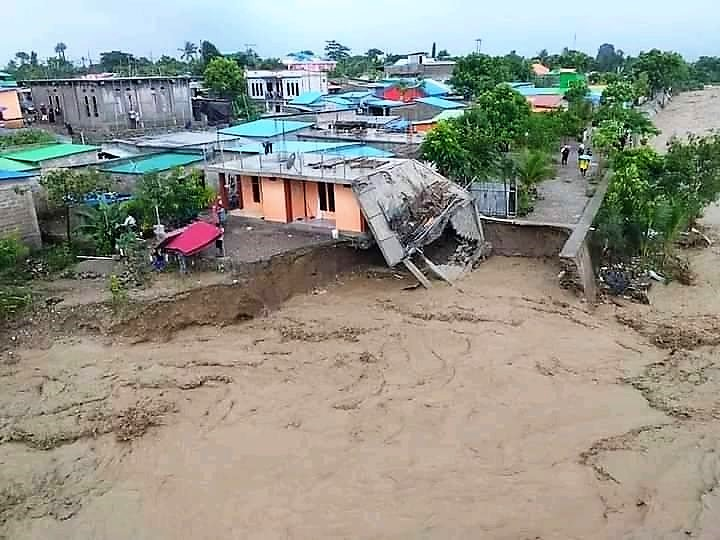
Flooding and soil liquefaction in the capital of Timor-Leste, Dili

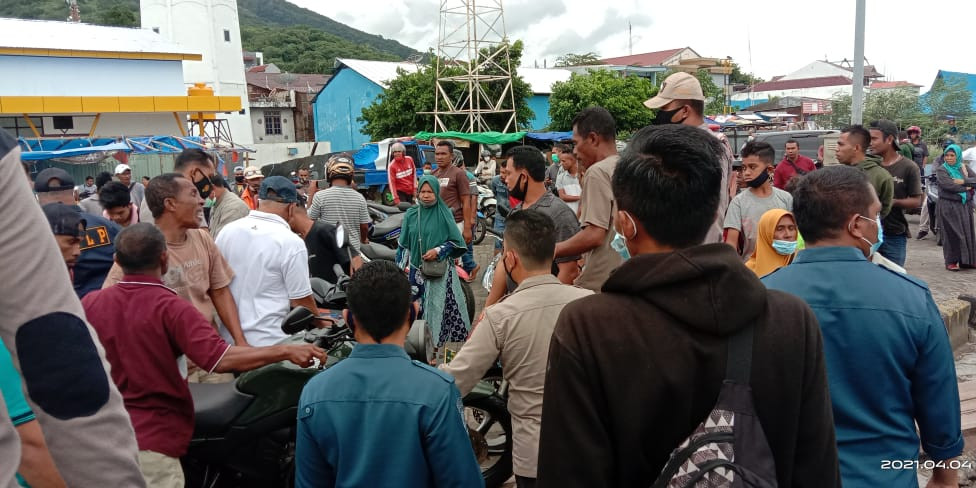
Aftermath of flood caused by the cyclone, East Flores Regency

=== Timor-Leste ===
In Timor-Leste, a landslide and floods displaced more than 8,000 people and was initially claimed to have led to the deaths of 42 people in total. The storm caused power outages in the entirety of Timor-Leste, in addition to damaging the presidential palace. Flood caused by the storm damaged the national laboratory of Guido Valadares National Hospital, the only laboratorium in the country, causing concern that it would affect Timor-Leste's effort to mitigate the COVID-19 pandemic. The floods also seemed to have damaged the country's central pharmacy, where vaccine stocks for East Timor population were stored. Other damaged facilities include two COVID-19 isolation facilities. It is thought that many more people in Timor-Leste have died due to the storm's widespread flooding. At least 30 people remain missing in the country.

Preliminary reports from 7 April 2021 showed that approximately 10,325 people were affected by the storm. 76% of those people were in the Dili municipality. The rains were so heavy that the capital was referred to as a "mud pit". Damage from Seroja in Timor-Leste was expected to exceed US$100 million, according to Prime Minister Taur Matan Ruak.

According to a report published in January 2022 by the United Nations Office for Disaster Risk Reduction (UNDRR), the flooding in Timor-Leste affected 13 municipalities and 30,322 households, destroyed 4,212 houses, took 34 lives, and was "... said to be the worst the country has seen in 50 years ...". The Timor-Leste country coordinator for the Australian Humanitarian Partnership consortium said that it was "anything but typical". The country manager of Australian People for Health, Education and Development Abroad (APHEDA) attributed it to the obstruction of waterways by housing erected along them. She said that such housing blocks water canals, and that the government needed to enforce the country's pre-independence rule against building within 100 m (330 ft) of bodies of water.

=== Indonesia ===
Wettest tropical cyclones and their remnants in Indonesia Highest-known totals
Precipitation			Storm	Location	Ref.
Rank	mm	in	Storm	Location	Ref.
1	383	15.1	Cempaka 2017	Pacitan, East Java	
2	223	8.78	Inigo 2003	Larantuka, Flores	
3	193	7.6	Kirrily 2009	Tual, Maluku Province	
4	159.7	6.29	Seroja 2021	Kalabahi, Alor Island	
5	148	5.8	17U 2019	Yogyakarta	

As a tropical low, Seroja caused widespread rainfall and thunderstorms in the West Nusa Tenggara and East Nusa Tenggara provinces in Indonesia. In the early hours of 4 April, floods struck the island, hours before people intended to gather for Easter celebrations. In the immediate aftermath, 41 people were killed and 28 were seriously injured. Bridges and roads connecting to Flores Island and Adonara Island were destroyed. The banks of two rivers in Ende district burst, killing two people and resulting in extensive flooding in East Flores. Dozens of homes were buried under mudslides in the village of Lamenele on Adonara island. In the East Flores Regency, fourteen villages were hit by flash flooding as a result of runoff of volcanic materials from Mount Ile Lewotolok. A local chief of a village in East Flores reported that hundreds of hectares of crops were destroyed. Dozens of farm animals were also reportedly swept away by flash floods. A majority of the casualties in East Flores were from the Nelelamadike village in Adonara Island after a massive rockslide struck the village. The village reported 55 deaths, of whom 15 were children. More than 600 residents of the village were left homeless by the cyclone.

In the city of Kupang, 734 houses were damaged, affecting 2,190 people, while in Rote Ndao, around 30 houses were flooded. A bridge connecting the cities of Kupang and Malaka Regency was destroyed, making travel between the two regions extremely difficult. A passenger ship, the Jatra I, sunk on a port in Kupang city, after experiencing a leak. No casualties were reported from the sinking. Another ship, the Namparnos, went adrift and grounded on Kambing Island. Trans-Timor roads were flooded, cutting off access between regencies. The office building of the governor of East Nusa Tenggara, commonly known as "Sasando Building," was also damaged by the cyclone. In East Nusa Tenggara and West Nusa Tenggara, approximately 11,406 people were displaced, while 66,036 homes were damaged.

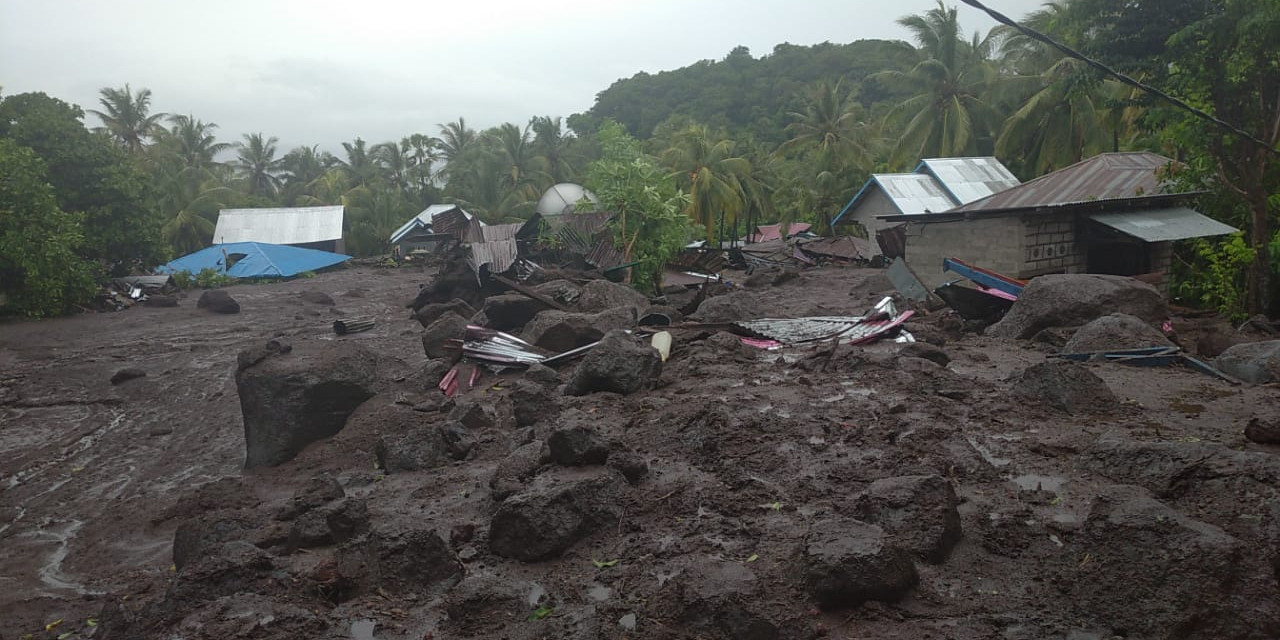
East Flores Regency which heavily impacted by floods and landslide.

Five cities and regencies experienced power outages, but electricity was partially restored later. At least 98 base transceiver stations in East Nusa Tenggara province were damaged, although some were restored later by the Ministry of Communication and Information Technology. Four fuel trucks owned by Pertamina were damaged. A dam in East Sumba overflowed, causing a flood in a neighboring city. The cyclone affected areas as far as the city of Bima in West Nusa Tenggara, where it caused floods, submerging 10,000 homes and affecting more than 27,000 people. On Lembata, the rain loosened solidified lava from an eruption in November of Ili Lewotolok volcano. The stone tumbled into several villages, killing at least 11 people. A garden which had belonged to several residents of Sikumana Village in Kupang was severely flooded and turned into a two-hectare wide karst lake, after the composition of limestone and karst rock was eroded. The karst lake was given the name "Tuaknatun Lake" by local residents due to the presence of teak trees nearby.

There were fears of a looming food crisis across East Nusa Tenggara as there were multiple reports of extensive damage on crops and stored food from harvests. Hundreds of livestock were reported as dead due to the flooding. Residents reported that more than 10,000 hectares of crops had been destroyed by the flood. In Malaka Regency, more than 4,000 hectares of crops were destroyed. This was worsened by the collapse of a spillway in the nearby Benanain Dam in the regency, which also serves as the main source of water for locals. The regency was one of the main food producer in East Nusa Tenggara. The extensive damage on crops and livestock in the regency may further worsen the crisis in the region.

As of 14 April, the death toll in the country had risen to 183. The high death toll was most likely because most people were sleeping when the cyclone made landfall, meaning that it was unexpected. In total, as much as 29 regencies and city across East Nusa Tenggara were affected by the cyclone. More than 70,000 structures across the region were damaged or destroyed and nearly half a million people were affected. Farmers in the seaweed industry in Kupang Regency lost an estimated 7 billion rupiah (US$484,000) due to crop failure and destruction of cultivation facilities/infrastructure attributed to Seroja. Total preliminary estimated losses in East Nusa Tenggara, according to the Indonesian National Board for Disaster Management, amounted to at least 3.4 trillion rupiah (US$236 million) as of May 2021.

=== Australia ===
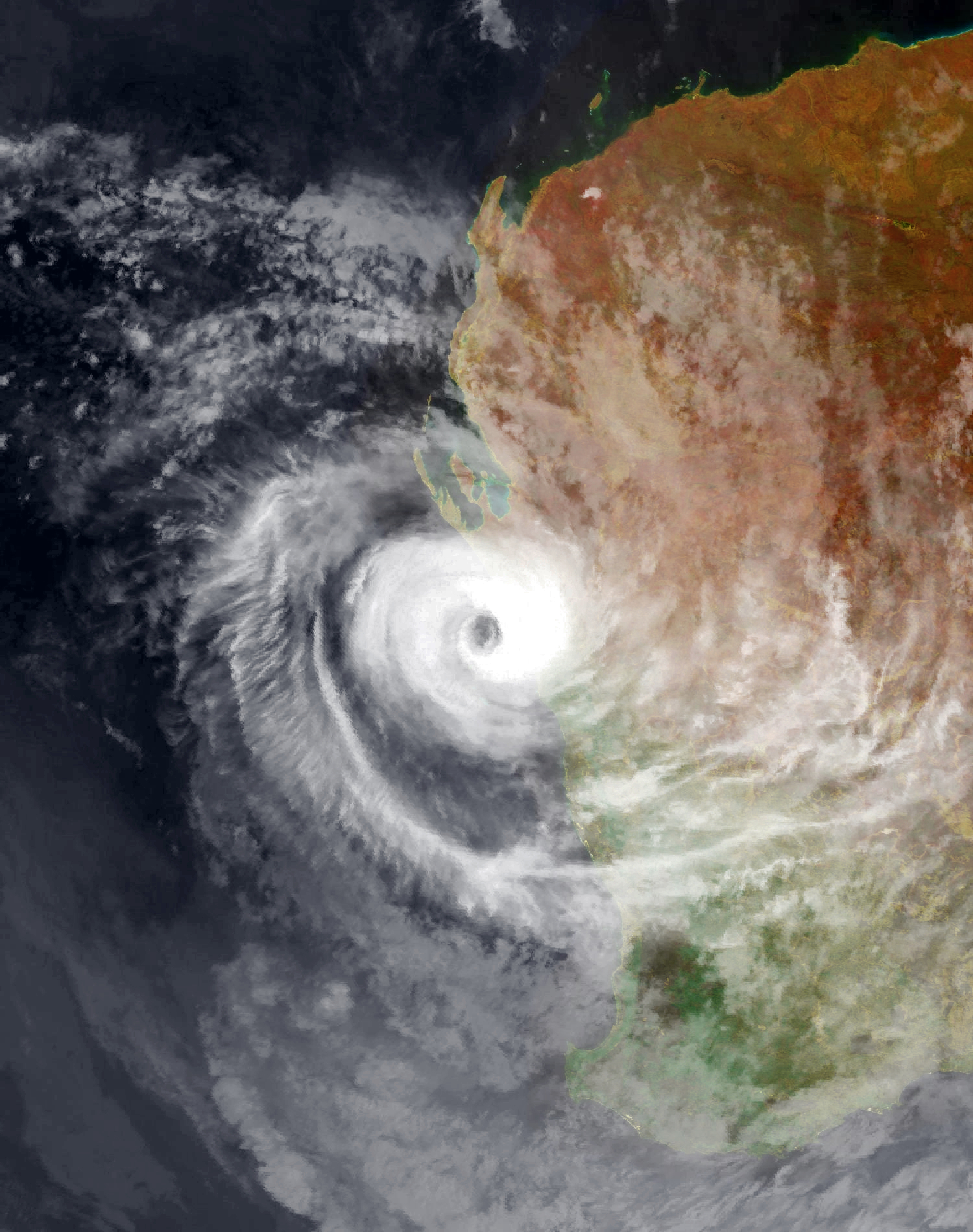
Cyclone Seroja making landfall in Western Australia on 11 April

After Seroja made landfall, around 4,350 people in Western Australia lost electricity as the storm's high winds downed power lines, particularly around Kalbarri. A wind gust of 170 kilometres per hour (110 mph), which was likely being one of the strongest wind gusts recorded in the city in more than 50 years. Rain up to 100 millimetres (3.9 in) was also reported in the town. This number of power outages soon increased to over 25,000 within hours of landfall as Seroja accelerated further inland. Shortly after, unconfirmed reports claimed that buildings had already had their roofs torn off and even entire homes and sheds were completely destroyed. Carnarvon's One Mile Jetty collapsed and floated out to sea. Some residents were required to barricade themselves within bathrooms or cupboards as their homes were damaged. In the daytime, Department of Fire and Emergency Services (DFES) reported that around 70% of structures in Kalbarri were damaged, while around 40% of those properties had been completely destroyed. The department also received around 175 calls by the morning of 12 April. Businesses based around the tourist industry in Kalbarri were afraid they might never be able to reopen.

News reporters reported that some houses had been completely flattened by the cyclone. Heavily damaged structures which previously used asbestos as a building material in Kalbarri left the presence of asbestos fibres on the ground and airborne, which can be deadly when inhaled. Widespread damage was also reported in Northampton. Shire of Northampton President Craig Simkins described the damage as if a "bomb had gone off", with many structures having lost their roofs or being severely damaged, leaving Simkins perplexed as to whether there should be a new building code to accommodate future cyclones in the region. Recovery was estimated to take several months or even years in the small town. Access and communication to towns further north impacted by the cyclone, such as Geraldton, were cut off, leaving the scale of damage in the city largely unknown. The cyclone was later declared as an 'insurance catastrophe', according to the Insurance Council of Australia.

During the cyclone, one person died; a 38-year-old maintenance worker who was electrocuted in Coral Bay after attempting to secure a caravan park's private power pole which had fallen down in the wind. There were no other reports of casualties or severe injuries. Australian Prime Minister Scott Morrison offered federal government support for recovery in Kalbarri. A fundraiser by Lord Mayor's Distress Fund in Western Australia raised AUD$2.75 million (US$2.12 million) in a little over a day to help families impacted by the cyclone. Australian footballer Jamie Cripps reportedly lost his family home which was destroyed in Northampton due to Seroja. DFES commissioner Darren Klemm said on 15 April that damage from Seroja could cost up to AUD$200 million (US$155 million) to repair. A total of 875 buildings were damaged by the cyclone, while at least 32 buildings were destroyed. Around 5,840 homes remained without power over a week after the cyclone, according to Western Power.

== Aftermath ==
=== Timor-Leste ===
Timor-Leste Prime Minister Taur Matan Ruak cited the floods as one of the most devastating incidents to affect the country in 40 years. The Timor-Leste government later held an emergency meeting to assess the situation. The Civil Protection Agency of Timor Leste planned an emergency response. According to the Lusa News Agency, it is impossible for Timor-Leste to currently balance the damage mitigation with the limited resources the country has. United Nations developmental coordinator Alex Tilman said Timor-Leste would not have the necessary resources alone to recover from the cyclone. Portugal was ready to send assistance to Timor-Leste, according to Foreign Minister Augusto Santos Silva. The European Union and United Nations also expressed sympathy and said that they were ready to assist the Timor-Leste government to repair damaged infrastructure and provide assistance for victims.

The East Timorese Minister of Interior distributed foods to victims in a hotel, which he said had been cooked by his wife. TSF Radio said the assistance was symbolic and far from enough to assist the victims. Local churches in Dili mobilized priests and pastors to help the victims voluntarily. The Government of Timor-Leste declared a state of emergency to speed up the mitigation process. In addition, the government asked the World Bank for support in assessing damages, and advice on longer-term implications for disaster risk management. The World Bank published its report in December 2021.

The leader of Fretilin, Mari Alkatiri, urged Timor-Leste government to ask for more international assistance such as helicopter and military cargo. He said he already met with United Nations ambassador on Dili to discuss about more assistance.

The Government of Timor-Leste reintroduced COVID-19 lockdown on three cities; Dili, Baucau, and Viqueque amid rising infection case after the disaster until 2 May. Transmission of other waterborne diseases such as cholera, dengue fever, and malaria was also expected to quickly rise due to the immense floods. The first COVID-19 death recorded in the country occurred shortly after the cyclone. Prime Minister of Australia Scott Morrison promised additional COVID-19 vaccine doses would be diverted to Timor-Leste.

=== Indonesia ===
Several schools on the Indonesia-Timor Leste border were evacuated by the Indonesian Army stationed there before they collapsed. Police in Kefamenanu assisted by the army evacuated most of the town residents amid flooding in the region. Evacuation processes in the East Flores Regency was hampered by the lack of heavy equipment, limited access to the sea, and a lack of effective shelter in the area. The Indonesian electricity company PLN was only able to repair 82% of damaged power infrastructure in residential areas, while the rest was difficult to repair because of the extreme weather and floods.

The City of Kupang declared a state of emergency, but they lacked emergency response funds and had limited personnel to provide a response. An emergency bridge was constructed to help victims evacuate in East Flores. Indonesian President Joko Widodo at a press conference on 5 April 2021, offered his condolences "in the name of all Indonesian people". He also urged all government institutions to mitigate the damage caused by the cyclone. In addition, the NasDem Party set up public kitchens for the victims. The chief of the Indonesian National Board for Disaster Management (BNPB), Doni Monardo planned to visit the affected regions on 5 April 2021. After the visit, he concluded that health infrastructures and facilities in most of East Nusa Tenggara are adequate, but lacked health workers and doctors. Later, the president also held a brief meeting to address the disaster.

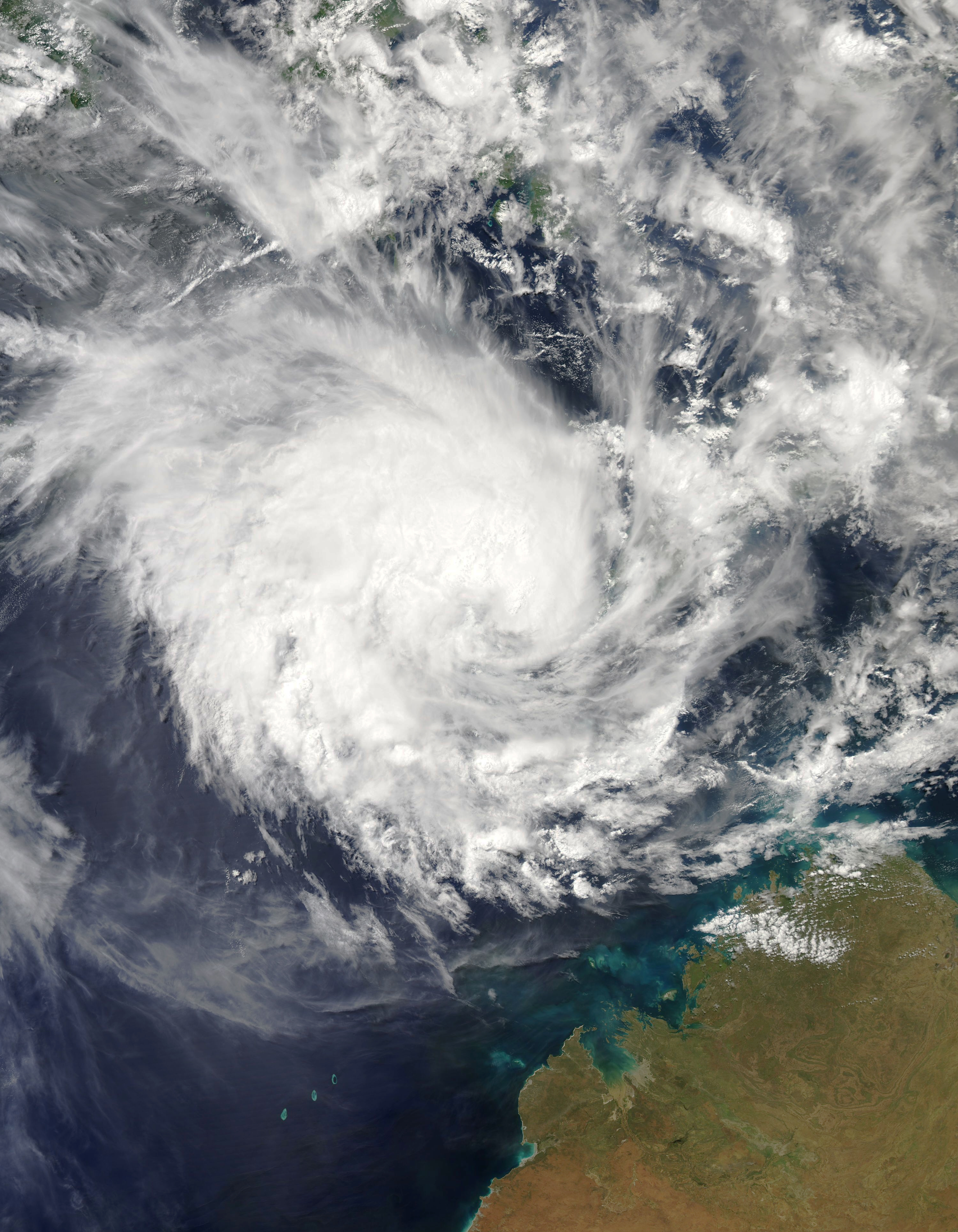
Seroja moving away from Indonesia on 5 April

In addition to rubber boats, shelters, and personnel, the Indonesian government sent food, blankets, masks, and COVID-19 rapid tests. Pertamina responded by replacing 4 damaged fuel trucks, which would be used to help distribute fuel to victims in the region. As of 5 April 11:00 a.m. Western Indonesian Time (WIB), a logistical route for fuel to Adonara Island has been restored. El Tari International Airport has resumed its operations on 5 April 10:00 WIB after being closed since the night before. Indonesia's navy readied hospital ships to help treat injured survivors. Helicopters also dropped food and other essentials into remote villages, while sniffer dogs were deployed to search for the dozens missing from the cyclone.

Distribution of aid was limited by the severe weather and damaged infrastructure. As the result, the government sent four helicopters and one cargo airplane to assist distribution. The People's Representative Council urged the government to speed up the distribution of relief and suggested using Indonesian army personnel to help overcome logistical hurdles. The Ministry of Social Affairs sent aid to flood victims in the city of Bima. Kodam IX/Udayana personnel constructed eight shelter center, 20 field kitchens, and six field hospitals. Hadi Tjahjanto, the Commander of Armed Forces, sent a navy ship known as KRI Oswald Siahaan (354), a Lockheed C-130 Hercules, a helicopter, and several battalions of military engineers from Kodam IX/Udayana and Kodam XIV/Hasanuddin to assist evacuation and reconstruction of infrastructures.

The central government of Indonesia prepared additional state funds to assist victims and the reconstruction of cities and villages in the province. Indonesians organized a donation campaign for victims, especially for East Nusa Tenggara, and gathered almost 1,000,000,000 rupiahs or around $70,000 as of 6 April. Ministry of Social Affairs gave compensation of around $1,000 each for deceased victims and $300 each to injured victims, in addition of other aids totaling around $760,000. Each family of a victim also received 500,000 rupiahs or $35 per month for them to pay rent on family's houses or local homestay, as to minimize amount of shelter camps amid COVID-19 until their house was reconstructed by the government. In addition, there's also compensation for each damaged houses; around $3,500 for heavily damaged, $1,500 for moderately damaged, and around $700 for lightly damaged. Governor of East Java, Khofifah Indar Parawansa also send additional assistance and aid to affected region. COVID-19 Task Force personnel were sent to the affected regions and shelters to limit the spread of COVID-19, using experience from 2021 South Kalimantan floods and 2021 West Sulawesi earthquake. The regional police of the province inspected all of the building material stores in the region to prevent sellers putting high prices for reconstruction.

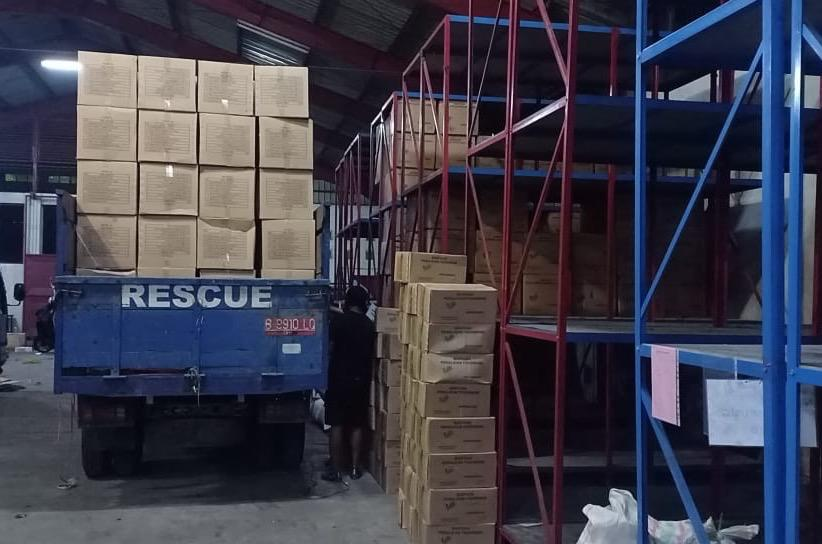
Logistical assistance from Indonesian Ministry of Social Affairs.

As of 6 April, more than 8,400 residents across the province had been evacuated. The majority of those who evacuated (at least 7,000 people) were residents in East Sumba Regency. The BNPB stated that at least 12 administrative regions in East Nusa Tenggara had been affected by the cyclone, of which 8 were severely affected. Chinese President Xi Jinping offered his condolences on the disaster. On Friday, president Joko Widodo paid a visit to Adonara Island and Lembata Regency.

Multiple local governments sent aids to affected areas. The government of West Sumatra sent 1.5 tons of rendang, a signature dish from the province, to East Nusa Tenggara. Additional funds of Rp 750 million were sent through BNPB, adding that funds will be allocated for the relief efforts in the region. Funds were also received from West Java, with a total of Rp 1 billion. The West Java regional government later stated: "The Governor of West Java and his administration would like to express our deepest condolences to the people of East Nusa Tenggara." The government of Central Java sent logistical aids worth at least Rp 306 million rupiah and donated Rp 457 million rupiah to East Nusa Tenggara. The European Union provided €200,000 (over 3.4 billion Indonesian rupiah) to Indonesia. Vincent Piket, the EU ambassador to Indonesia, stated: "With this assistance, the EU is expressing its solidarity with Indonesia for the many people afflicted by Cyclone Seroja. The EU stands ready to support those in need in times of crisis."

Currently, regions affected in Indonesia already moved into rehabilitation and reconstruction process as more missing victims were found and the cyclone is moving away. After receiving orders from President Joko Widodo to relocate the survivors, Governor of East Nusa Tenggara Viktor Laiskodat urged local leaders to immediately choose the suitable locations for the relocation efforts. Reconstruction on the damaged buildings will be compensated by the government through the Indonesian Ministry of Public Works and Housing.

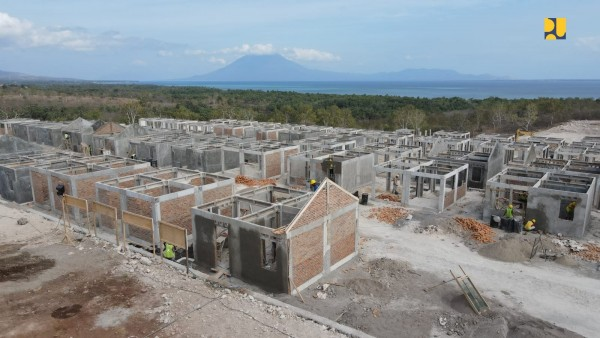
House constructions in relocated area in Lembata Regency. The cyclone damaged many villages and prompted government to relocate several settlements.

Despite calls from several prominent public figures in the province to declare Cyclone Seroja as a national disaster, Governor of East Nusa Tenggara Viktor Laiskodat refused to do so, stating that efforts from the central government were sufficient to meet the needs of the survivors.

==== Controversy ====
The lack of warnings by the government prior to the cyclone and no direct response by the local government was criticized by Indonesian netizens and NGOs, such as WALHI, for worsening the effects of the cyclone. The hashtag #PrayforNTT became viral in Indonesia on Twitter. WALHI pressured the provincial government of the province of East Nusa Tenggara to declare a state of emergency and criticized the lack of a response from the governor there, Viktor Laiskodat. The Prosperous Justice Party criticized Indonesian president Joko Widodo for attending the marriage of Indonesian celebrity Atta Halilintar instead of addressing the disaster of Seroja. The governor of East Nusa Tenggara declared a state of emergency on 6 April 2021, which was thought to be too late by many. People in the affected regions asked President Joko Widodo to come instead of asking local officials to assist because they are considered too slow and uncoordinated. A member of the Indonesia National Student Movement from the region harshly criticized the local government and asked the President to directly see and discipline them.

The destruction that was caused by Cyclone Seroja further exposed the lack of mitigation efforts and the vulnerability of Indonesia to natural disasters. On 7 April, due to the perceived unresponsiveness and incompetence from East Nusa Tenggara provincial disaster mitigation agency on the aftermath of Cyclone Seroja, the head of the agency, Thomas Bangke, was fired by the governor. A similar course of action was taken by the mayor of Kupang, where the head of the city's regional mitigation agency was fired for being "slow".

=== Retirement ===
Due to its onslaught, the name Seroja was retired from the naming list and was replaced by Rambutan.

== See also ==
- Tropical cyclones in 2021
- 1973 Flores cyclone – Deadliest known tropical cyclone in the Southern Hemisphere; affected similar areas
- Cyclone Guba – Brought severe damage to Papua New Guinea, killing 149
- Cyclone Cempaka – Severely impacted Java and Bali, stalling just offshore
- Cyclone Lili – Passed through similar areas, bringing mild to moderate impact
- Cyclone Savannah – Brought significant damage to Java and Bali despite remaining well offshore
