= List of Indonesian tornadoes =

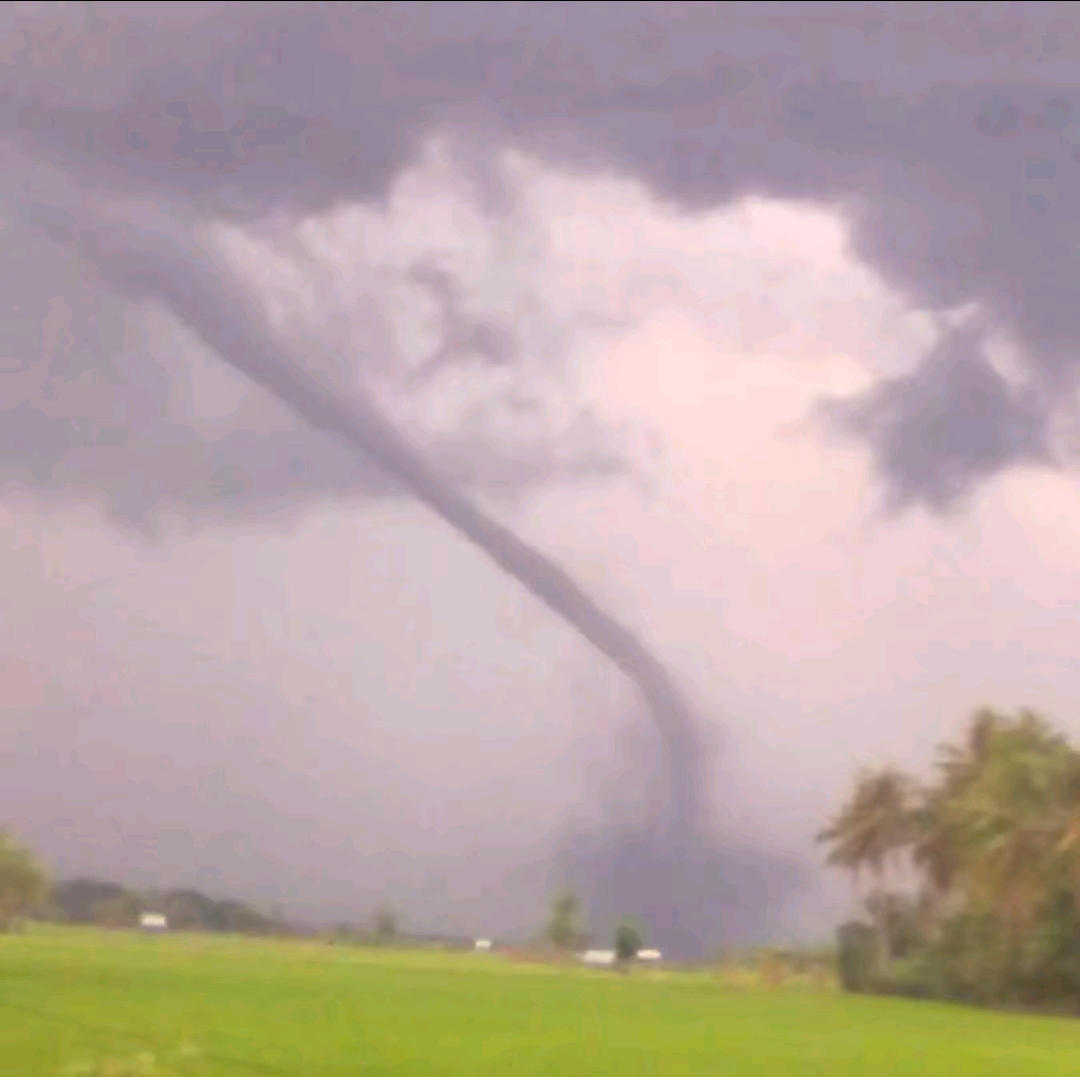
Tornado that struck Belawa and Wette'e. February 24, 2012

The country of Indonesia has experienced several tornadoes, most recently in June 2026.

== Climatology and background ==
A tornado refers to a violently rotating column of air that reaches the ground, which can be among the most destructive of all atmospheric phenomena. In Indonesia, such events are called "angin puting beliung". Many believed that Indonesia is safe from tornadoes due to the mountains protecting them, but this myth has since been disproven.

== Events ==
Date	Location	Description	Fatalities	Injuries	Structures Damaged
December 7, 1815	Surabaya	A violent tornado passed through the town; and associated lightning strike hit a residence, killing one person and injuring four others, making this the earliest recorded tornado event in Indonesian history.	1	4	1
October 27, 1837	Banyumas	Heavy rain and a tornado caused widespread treefall and structural damage to buildings and government residences.	0	0	Several
February 23, 1840	Paiton, Probolinggo	A highly destructive historical landspout tornado tracked through the coastal areas of Paiton and Jabung. The severe vortex completely flattened around 40 traditional bamboo and timber stilt houses (*kampung* structures), completely uprooted several massive native trees along its narrow path, And caused extensive localized ground scouring And from Blue Ayanami and the Tornado Archive database, it is rated F2..	3	15	40
January 25, 1848	Kalianget, Sumenep, Madura	A localized tornado struck near the coastal village of Pinggirpapas. The vortex lifted and severely damaged three small traditional fishing boats, rendering them completely unusable. No injuries or fatalities were reported among the local coastal community And the initial vortex occurred at coordinates is 7.06° S, 113.87° E.	0	0	3
September 25, 1849	Kendal, Central Java	A destructive tornado struck the Timbang area within the Kendal Regency. The vortex overturned and heavily damaged approximately 20 traditional native bamboo and timber homes. Despite the significant structural damage inflicted upon the settlement, no serious injuries or fatalities were reported among the local residents, and the walan vortex occurred at coordinates is 6.96° S, 110.07° E And Blue Ayanami rated it F1.	0	0	20
November 11, 1849	Purbalingga, Banyumas	A violent historical tornado struck the Purbalingga district around 4:00 PM local time, tracking for 3.2 km. The severe vortex completely leveled 85 traditional bamboo houses across several villages. It also severely damaged the local post office in Jelis and a structure near the new indigo factory in Majasem. Tragically, the catastrophic structural collapses resulted in two fatalities, and the initial vortex occurred at coordinates 7.42° S, 109.38° E. And End vortex is 7.44° S, 109.41° E	2	0	85
December 11, 1849	Kediri–Blitar	A violent historical tornado tore through the agricultural valley bordering Kediri and Blitar at 2 PM. The destructive vortex completely leveled over 128 traditional bamboo and timber homes, obliterated extensive coffee and sugar plantation crops, and unroofed several localized storage buildings. Debris from the flattened structures was reportedly lofted, and trees also sustained damage, including 900 dadap trees and 3,400 coffee trees and scattered across a narrow damage path And path length is 24.1 km And start location is 7.93° S, 111.96° E And end location is 8.1° S, 112.09° E, and Blue Ayanami Rated rated it an F2.	4	22	128
November 13, 1850	Kembang, Jepara	A violent historical tornado struck the coastal settlement of Kembang at 09:00 UTC. The severe vortex completely destroyed two large tobacco warehouses belonging to the prominent manufacturer K. J. F. Bousquet. The structural failure was catastrophic; the heavy brick pillars supporting the facilities were entirely leveled, and the roof structures were violently torn off and lofted over a significant distance. Total financial damage to the establishment was officially estimated at approximately 25,000 guilders. Additionally, two horses inside the facility were crushed to death by collapsing debris And the walan vortex occurred at coordinates is 6.47° S, 110.82° E And Blue Ayanami rated it an F2.	8	7	2
September 23, 1851	Pule, Ngawi, Madiun	A significant historical tornado completely destroyed the post office building in Pule, causing severe structural failure. The brick pillars supporting the facility were entirely leveled, and the roof was violently thrown a significant distance by the vortex. Additionally, two horses were crushed to death under the collapsing structure And start location tornado is 7.37° S, 111.59° E and was rated by Blue Ayanami as an F2.	1	6	1 post office
February 27, 1913	Ciumbuleuit, Bandung	Strong tornado struck a plantation area; factory walls toppled, many crew homes destroyed or damaged.	0	0	Many
January 1922	East Bandung	a probable tornado damaged a telephone network, which disrupting long-distance calls from Bandung.	0	0	1
April 13, 1923	Yogyakarta	A violent historical tornado developed from a dark, rotating mesocyclonic cloud base over the city area. The vortex heavily damaged several colonial residential sectors, completely ripping off corrugated iron roofs and splintering brick walls and multiple structures heavily damaged. The initial vortex occurred at 7.75° S, 110.4° E.	1	12	Multiple
March 11, 1928	Yogyakarta	A historical landspout tornado developed over the urban sectors of Yogyakarta, damaging the roof structures of several colonial residences and outbuildings. The initial vortex occurred at, 7.95° S, 110.2° E.	0	1+	Several
December 24, 1928	Buaran, Pekalongan, Central Java	A tornado destroyed about thirty houses, toppled large trees, and severed telephone and power lines.	0	0	~30
October 11, 1933	Rancaekek, Bandung Regency	A tornado destroyed 17 homes, stripped the roofs of 30 others, and uprooting many trees, causing 1 fatality.	1	0	47
November 11, 1938	Ciparay, Bandung Regency	A strong tornado collapsed nine market warehouses, causing numerous injuries. The storm was accompanied by frequent lightning strikes, which killed two residents.	0	Many	9+
November 25, 1940	Tuntang, Semarang Regency	A tornado destroyed 11 houses, injured seven people, and killed two people.	2	7	11
November 26, 1948	Palimanan, Cirebon	A tornado damaged about 100 houses, with the heaviest damage inflicted on the district's main town.	0	0	100
July 7, 1954	Cibaregbeg, Sukabumi	A tornado struck Cibaregbeg at around 16:00 WIB, destroying 37 houses, snapping several trees and power grid wires.	0	0	37
November 19, 1956	Menawan, Grobogan, Central Java	A tornado collapsed 16 houses and severely damaged 29 others, killing a mother and her 18-month-old baby.	2	0	45
December 5, 1956	Banyuwangi	A catastrophic tornado destroyed 7,500 homes across three subdistricts, injuring 50 residents and leaving 40 others dead.	40	50	7,500
October 29, 1983	Pesisir Selatan Regency, West Sumatra	A tornado swept away three homes and damaged five others in Lunang II, causing no casualties.	0	0	8
June 29, 1985	Lebung, Musi Banyuasin, Sumatra	A tornado struck the village of Lebung in Musi Banyuasin, destroying 220 homes along with several schools and mosques.	0	0	220+
February 18, 2007	Lempuyangan, Yogyakarta	Anticyclonic tornado reaching 70 km/h; damaged over 1,000 buildings, mostly roofs. Known as id:Lesus Lempuyangan.	0	0	1,000+
March 9, 2009	Talun Village, Pati	A tornado touch down near Talun village approximately 17.00 WIB as dozens of other houses suffered light damage, one school was heavily damaged, and one prayer room was lightly damaged after being hit by a tornado. the tornado dissipated after 5 minutes.	0	0	34
February 24, 2012	Wette'e, Sidrap, South Sulawesi	Violent, rare anticyclonic tornado leveled and slabbed some houses; trees were heavily debarked and debranched.	5	50	57
December 7, 2012	Sleman, Yogyakarta	A mesocyclonic tornado struck 10 hamlets in 3 villages at around 14:30 WIB, damaging 519 houses.	0	0	519
December 11, 2013	Denpasar, Bali	A Mesocyclonic rope tornado damaged several houses, billboards, and buildings, a nearby radar revealed a hook echo.	0	0	Several
December 14, 2014	Cibiru, Panyileukan, Cinambo and Ujung Berung, Bandung	A strong tornado damaged a factory, uprooted over 70 trees, and damaged over 700 houses.	1	0	700+
June 7, 2015	Bontang Kuala, Bontang City, East Kalimantan	A tornado that originated as a waterspout, damaged 32 homes in three neighborhoods.	0	3	32
October 12, 2016	Pangandaran	Tornadic waterspout moved ashore and damaged several houses.	1	0	Several
November 26, 2016	Sidrap, Sulawesi	A nocturnal tornado killed one person and injuring two others. Approximately 18 to 20 homes were damaged, with six completely flattened to the ground.	1	2	18-20
March 7, 2017	Singosari, Malang	A strong tornado hit Langlang village, destroying roofs and causing local power outages.	0	7	248
March 20, 2017	Singosari, Malang	A tornado hit Blandit Barat in Wonorejo village for about 10 minutes, bringing down roof materials onto residential areas.	0	1	115
November 22, 2017	Sidoarjo Regency, East Java	Destructive tornado caused damage to 600 homes, with some roofs and walls ripped off and injuring 35 people.	0	35	600
December 31, 2017	Bojongnangka and Tambakrejo, Pemalang	A strong tornado damaged 185 houses in two villages, and sub-district at around 16:30 WIB, five buildings were flattened, 21 residents were rushed to a hospital after being crushed by falling debris.	0	21	185
December 30, 2018	Cirebon	A tornado damaged 165 houses, killed a resident, and injured nine people.	1	9	165
January 11–12, 2019	Karawang, Rancaekek (Bandung Regency), and Sukabumi, West Java	Four tornadoes struck over two days; first hit Karawang, second and third struck Rancaekek, fourth hit Sukabumi.	0	3	760+
May 20, 2020	Tulang Bawang regency	Destructive QLCS tornado spawned along the leading edge of a squall line; 66 homes badly damaged or destroyed, 179 with minor damage.	2	6	245
December 15, 2020	Sangatta, East Kalimantan	A tornado occurred at 16:00 WITA, where it destroyed 20 homes.	0	1	20
January 2, 2021	Slangit Village, Cirebon Regency	A tornado occurred at 16:50 WIB, where it damaged a total of 278 houses, 6 were severely damaged, 3 were flattened, and uprooted trees which toppled onto buildings.	0	0	278
March 28, 2021	Cimenyan, Bandung Regency	A multi-vortex tornado occurred at 16:00 WIB, where it damaged a total of 298 houses, uprooted trees which crushed 2 vehicles, and downed local power infrastructure, and injured five people with two of the victims were severely injured.	0	5	298
April 3, 2021	Pinggir Papas, Kalianget, Sumenep Regency	A tornado occurred at 13:00 WIB, damaged 18 houses and injured three people.	0	3	18
October 23, 2022	Sidoarjo, East Java	A highly destructive tornado formed at 14:30 WIB over the Buduran district. Tornadogenesis was captured on multiple civilian videos, showing a large multi-vortex structure descending from a prominent rotating wall cloud. BMKG Doppler weather radar data from Juanda International Airport identified a localized mesocyclonic signature with strong gate-to-gate shear and peak reflectivity factors reaching 45–52 dBZ within a severe convective cell. The violent vortex ripped through three villages (Sidokepung, Entelseweng, and Tanjungsari), tearing off roofs, collapsing brick walls, and toppling steel power pylons and 294 houses destroyed and 2 hotels damaged. The initial vortex occurred at 7.42° S, 112.7° E.	0	4	296
January 2, 2023	Tenggarong, East Kalimantan	QLCS nocturnal tornado collapsed the recently renovated roof of a stadium; several other areas affected.	0	0	Several
January 13, 2023	Paseh, Sumedang	A tornado that occurred at 17:00 WIB, where it damaged a house, and uprooted a tree.	0	0	1
November 13, 2023	Samboja Kuala, Kutai Kertanegara Regency, East Kalimantan	Tornado damaged a school, houses, and a school bus terminal; roofs seen flying in circles.	0	0	Several
February 4, 2024	Prambon, Sidoarjo	Destructive tornado spawned by an embedded supercell formed by two merging squall lines; walls collapsed and roofs ripped off.	1	2	44–100
February 21, 2024	Jatinangor, Sumedang and Rancaekek, Bandung, West Java	A tornado occurred at 15:30 – 16:00 WIB and travelled 6 km, where over 1,100 structures were damaged to varying degrees. Factory roofs were peeled off, roofs were torn off hundreds of residential homes, walls collapsed, and heavy metal billboards were twisted, and 20 to 47 residents were reportedly injured.	0	20-47	1,100+
February 24, 2025	Jambu Kulon, Klaten	A tornado damaged 60 houses, and severely damaged a briquette factory and a traditional joglo pavilion. A local public health center some school facilities were affected, two people were injured.	0	2	60+
March 17, 2025	Telanjung, Bekasi	A tornado collapse two residential houses, while six others sustained light to major damages, collapsed a BTS telecommunication tower, thrown a vehicle, and injured 2 people.	0	2	8
November 2, 2025	Dau, Malang	A tornado struck Semanding and Krajan hamlets in Sumbersekar village, ripping off residential roofs, a pole collapsed, trees collapsed. This tornado was likely produced by a supercell storm .	0	1	137
November 16, 2025	Langensari, Banjar	A weak tornado occurred at 17:00 WIB where it damaged the roofs of multiple houses.	0	0	Multiple
January 8, 2026	Juanda International Airport and Ule Ateng	An brief anticyclonic tornado occurred at 14:10 WIB that lasted for 10 minutes, where it uprooted trees, which crushed parked vehicles, and left motorcycles scattered. BMKG observations recorded wind speeds around 85 km/h (approximately 53 MPH).	0	0	1
March 6, 2026	Kotabaru Parahyangan to Cimahi (via Ngamprah)	Short-lived, damaging tornado; damaged 129 buildings along its path.	0	4–5	129
March 11, 2026	Muara, Cirebon	Short-lived but powerful tornado damaged at least 242 houses and several schools, leaving many with torn-off roofs.	0	0	242+
June 7, 2026	Api-Api, Riau	Strong rain-wrapped tornado caused major roof damage, uprooted trees, and heavily debranched hardwood trees.	0	0	Several

== Climatological statistics ==
The following is a chart showing Indonesia tornadoes by month or by time period.

Number of recorded tornadoes affecting Indonesia
Month	Number of tornadoes
January	8
February	5
March	3
April	1
May	1
June	1
July	1
October	2
November	7
December	5

Tornadoes affecting Indonesia by period
Period	Number of tornadoes
1900–49	4
1950s	2
1980s	2
2000s	1
2010s	11
2020s	14

== See also ==
- Tropical cyclones in Indonesia
- Lists of tornadoes and tornado outbreaks
