= Cyclone Cempaka =

Category 1 Australian region cyclone in 2017

Tropical Cyclone Cempaka
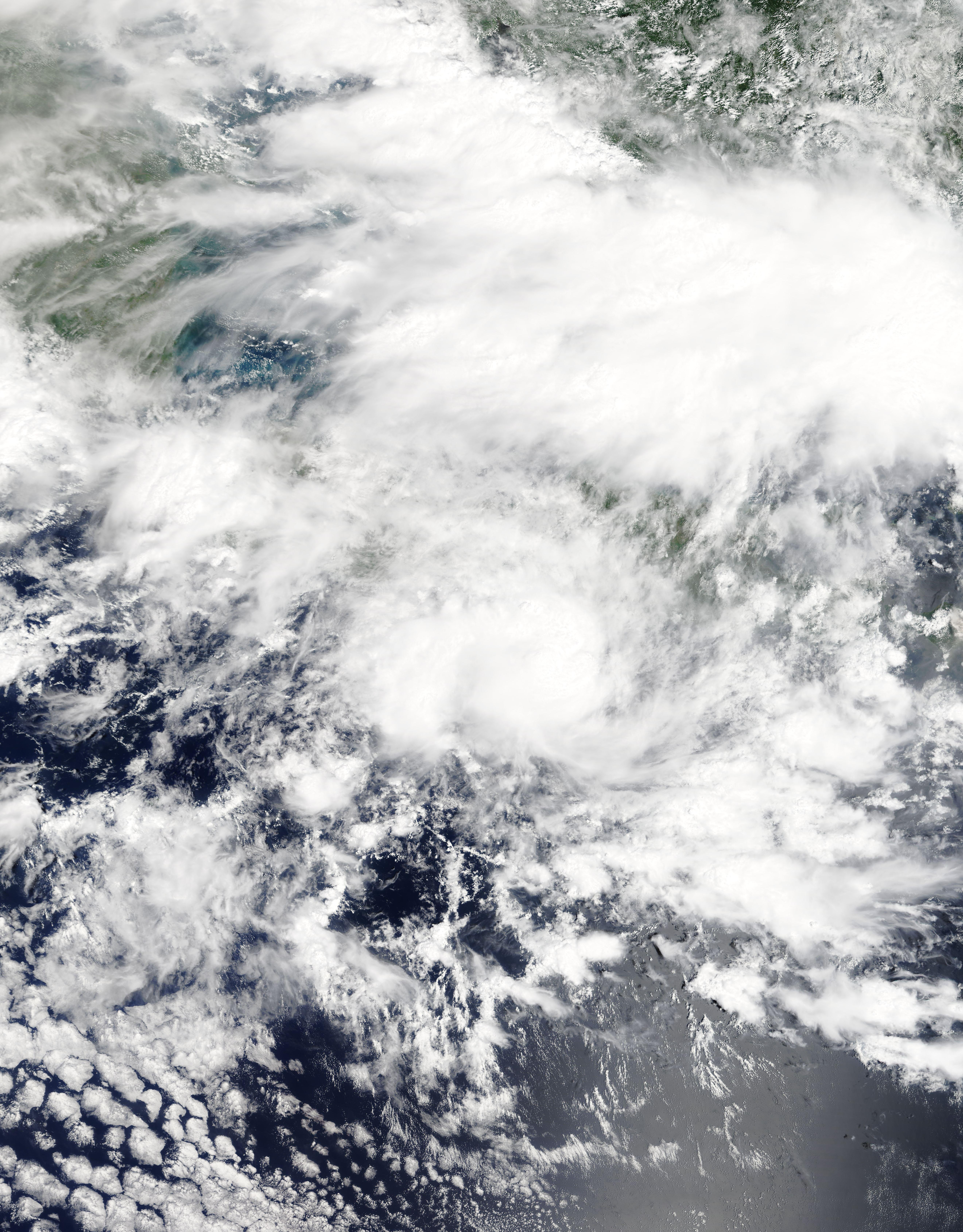
- Cempaka off the coast of East Java on 27 November

Meteorological history
- Formed: 22 November 2017
- Remnant low: 29 November 2017
- Dissipated: 1 December 2017

Category 2 tropical cyclone
- 10-minute sustained (BOM)
- Highest winds: 110 km/h (70 mph)
- Highest gusts: 155 km/h (100 mph)
- Lowest pressure: 990 hPa (mbar); 29.23 inHg

Overall effects
- Fatalities: 41 total
- Damage: $83.6 million (2017 USD)
- Areas affected: Central Java, Special Region of Yogyakarta, East Java, Bali, Banten, West Java
- IBTrACS /
- Part of the 2017–18 Australian region cyclone season

Tropical Cyclone Cempaka was a tropical cyclone that impacted the island of Java and Bali, Indonesia in November 2017. Although it did not make landfall, Cempaka managed to cause 41 deaths, with more than 20,000 people evacuated and causing around US$83.6 million in damages. Cempaka was the fourth cyclone to be registered in Indonesia by the Tropical Cyclone Warning Center of the Indonesian Meteorology, Climatology, and Geophysical Agency (BMKG) since 2008 and the first since Cyclone Bakung in 2014. It also came closer to making landfall in that country than any other cyclone on record.

== Meteorological history ==
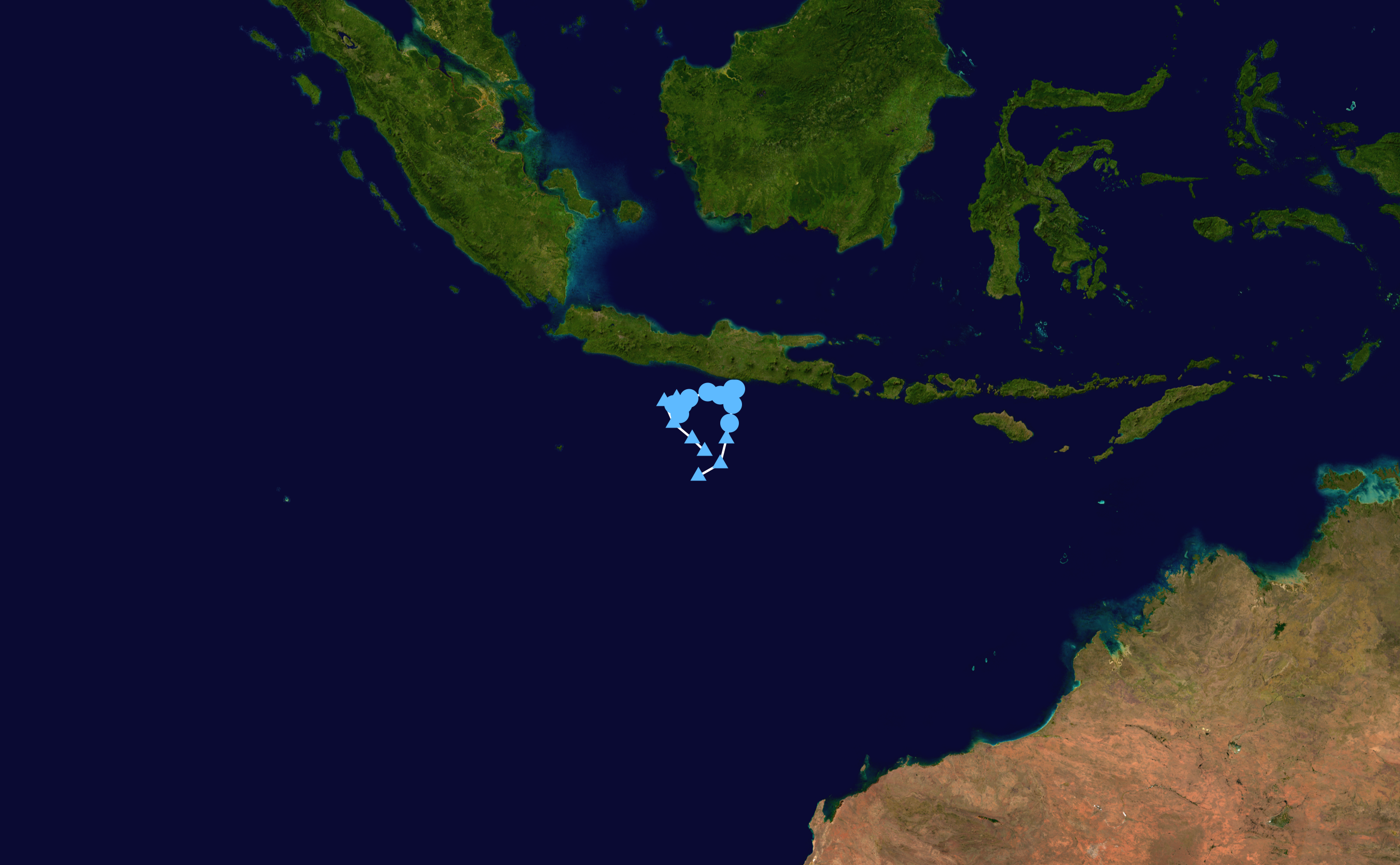
Map plotting the storm's track and intensity, according to the Saffir–Simpson scale Map key Saffir–Simpson scale Tropical depression (≤38 mph, ≤62 km/h) Tropical storm (39–73 mph, 63–118 km/h) Category 1 (74–95 mph, 119–153 km/h) Category 2 (96–110 mph, 154–177 km/h) Category 3 (111–129 mph, 178–208 km/h) Category 4 (130–156 mph, 209–251 km/h) Category 5 (≥157 mph, ≥252 km/h) Unknown Storm type Tropical cyclone Subtropical cyclone Extratropical cyclone, remnant low, tropical disturbance, or monsoon depression

Cempaka initially developed as a weak tropical low around 332 km (206 mi) south of the city of Surabaya on 22 November as monitored by TCWC Perth and TCWC Jakarta. At 06:00 UTC on 26 November, TCWC Jakarta recorded that the system was located 195 km (121 mi) southwest of the city of Cilacap as a tropical depression with a maximum wind speed of 45 km/h (30 mph). Wave heights of 2–4 m (7–13 ft) across the central and east southern coast of Java were predicted and a warning was issued.

A Tropical Cyclone Formation Alert was issued by the Joint Typhoon Warning Center the next morning on 27 November, stating that satellite imagery depicted flaring convection near the center of the system. Several hours later, TCWC Jakarta upgraded the system to a tropical cyclone, giving the name Cempaka which was then located 100 km (62 mi) south-southeast of Cilacap. BMKG warned of heavy rainfall across the island of Java with possible flooding and landslides. On 29 November, Cempaka weakened into a tropical low and turned to the southwest away from Java. It continued moving to the southwest on the following day. TCWC Perth and Jakarta last mentioned Cempaka on 1 December.

== Impact ==
Hourly precipitation of parts of Java during Cyclone Cempaka.

Cyclone Cempaka never made landfall, but the rainfall it brought caused severe flooding and landslides across 28 regencies and cities in Java, mainly along the southern part of the island. Tornadoes were also reported in the area. Pacitan received 383 mm (15.1 in) of rain on 27 November while Yogyakarta received 286 mm (11.3 in) on 28 November, both considered to be "extreme" amounts of daily rainfall by BMKG. On 29 November, the government of Yogyakarta declared an emergency. By 30 November, 26 deaths were reported and more than 14,000 people were evacuated in Central Java, East Java, and Yogyakarta according to the Indonesian National Board for Disaster Management (BNPB). Tens of thousands of houses and agricultural lands were flooded. Roads were covered by landslides and bridges were destroyed in border regencies of Central Java and East Java, isolating some remote villages. Indonesians and several politicians took into social media to express their condolences using the hashtag #PrayForPacitan. President Joko Widodo called the people to "remain vigilant" while relief efforts were being undertaken by the national and local government agencies. The cyclone also changed the direction of ash from Agung Volcano in Bali from eastward toward Lombok to westward across Banyuwangi and Jember. By early December, BNPB counted that at least 41 people reportedly had died in regards to the cyclone. Victims were spread in Pacitan, Yogyakarta region, Wonogiri, Purworejo, and Wonosobo. More than 28,000 were staying in shelters while the cost of the damages was estimated at Rp1.13 trillion (US$83.6 million).

== Rarity ==
The region of Indonesia is not generally traversed by tropical cyclones, although numerous systems have historically formed there. Cyclone Cempaka was among the few tropical cyclones in the southern hemisphere which ever struck the region. An analysis of tropical cyclone data from the Bureau of Meteorology since 1907 to 2017 found that only around 0.62% of all cyclones in the Australian region during those years occurred north of the 10th parallel south.

== See also ==
- Weather of 2017 and 2018
- Tropical cyclones in 2017 and 2018
- Tropical Storm Vamei
- Cyclone Durga
- Cyclone Anggrek
- Cyclone Bakung
- Cyclone Savannah
- Cyclone Seroja
