= 1973 Flores cyclone =

Category 3 Australian region cyclone in 1973

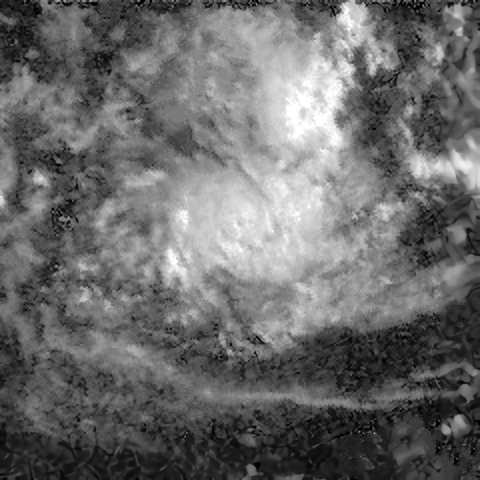
- Satellite image of the Flores cyclone on 28 April

Meteorological history
- Formed: 26 April 1973
- Dissipated: 29 or 30 April 1973

Category 3 severe tropical cyclone
- 10-minute sustained (Aus)
- Highest winds: 150 km/h (90 mph)
- Lowest pressure: 950 hPa (mbar); 28.05 inHg

Category 3-equivalent tropical cyclone
- 1-minute sustained (SSHWS)
- Highest winds: 185 km/h (115 mph)
- Lowest pressure: 950 hPa (mbar); 28.05 inHg

Overall effects
- Fatalities: 1,650-1,653 total (Deadliest tropical cyclone recorded in the Southern Hemisphere)
- Damage: $5 million (USD)
- Areas affected: Indonesia
- IBTrACS
- Part of the 1972–73 Australian region cyclone season

The 1973 Flores cyclone was the deadliest known tropical cyclone in the Southern Hemisphere. The cyclone formed in the Banda Sea on 26 April as a tropical low. It intensified as it moved in a west-southwest direction, before shifting to the south. Early on 29 April, the cyclone peaked as a Category 3 storm on the Australian tropical cyclone intensity scale used in the region with 10-minute sustained winds of 150 km/h (90 mph) and a pressure of 950mb (28.05 inHg), before striking the north coast of the Indonesian island of Flores, later dissipating.

The cyclone killed 1,650 to 1,653 people, including 1,500 fishermen on Palue Island alone, and resulted in losses of around $5 million (USD). The cyclone dropped heavy rainfall across Flores, causing deadly flash flooding that damaged buildings and roads, destroying or damaging thousands of houses. Additionally, on 29 April, a Portuguese ship travelling from Portuguese Timor to Thailand capsized in the Flores Sea, leaving one survivor. Authorities in the Indonesian capital Jakarta received news of the disaster in Flores a month after the cyclone's passage, with the ship's sinking officially confirmed on 28 May.

== Meteorological history ==
Map plotting the storm's track and intensity, according to the Saffir–Simpson scale Map key Saffir–Simpson scale Tropical depression (≤38 mph, ≤62 km/h) Tropical storm (39–73 mph, 63–118 km/h) Category 1 (74–95 mph, 119–153 km/h) Category 2 (96–110 mph, 154–177 km/h) Category 3 (111–129 mph, 178–208 km/h) Category 4 (130–156 mph, 209–251 km/h) Category 5 (≥157 mph, ≥252 km/h) Unknown Storm type Tropical cyclone Subtropical cyclone Extratropical cyclone, remnant low, tropical disturbance, or monsoon depression

There is no recorded data of the unnamed cyclone in the Tropical Cyclone Warning Center of the Indonesian Meteorology, Climatology, and Geophysical Agency. However, Australia's Bureau of Meteorology has records of the cyclone.

On 26 April, a tropical low formed in the Banda Sea. According to Australia's Bureau of Meteorology (BoM), the low moved to the west-southwest and intensified, although this was based on a later analysis. As the storm was outside of the agency's jurisdiction, the BoM did not issue warnings on the system at the time. The low attained gale-force winds late on 27 April as it moved into the Flores Sea. Late the next day, the storm turned southwestward.

The BoM estimated that the storm reached peak intensity early on 29 April, assessing it as a Category 3 on the Australian tropical cyclone intensity scale, with 10-minute maximum sustained winds of 150 km/h (90 mph) and a minimum central pressure of 950mb (28.05 inHg), whilst meteorologist Charlie J. Neumann estimated in a reanalysis that the storm had reached 1-minute maximum sustained winds of 185 kilometres per hour (115 mph). While near peak intensity, the small cyclone had its eye embedded within a central dense overcast, 295 km (185 mi) in diameter. Its eye was also evident on an infrared satellite image at 0140 UTC. (Note: Approximate location: 8°S 121.5°E.)

The cyclone made landfall on the northern coast of the Indonesian island of Flores at around 09:00 WITA with maximum sustained winds of 120 km/h (75 mph) and a pressure of 975 millibars (28.79 inHg). After crossing the island, the BoM recorded that the cyclone turned northwest and made landfall a second time before dissipating inland on 30 April, whilst Neumann assessed that the storm dissipated near Flores' southern coast a few hours after making landfall.

== Impacts ==
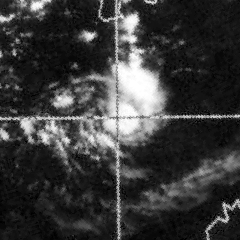
The cyclone on 29 April at 10:00 WITA (02Z)

No warnings were issued in preparation of the cyclone. At the time, the cyclone was not in Australia's area of responsibility, and up until an eye was visible prior to the cyclone's landfall in Flores, forecasters were uncertain of the cyclone's existence due to limited observations.

=== O Arbiru ===
Manufactured in 1963, O Arbiru was a Portuguese-flagged government cargo vessel that was used to transport necessities to Portuguese Timor via Bangkok, Thailand. The ship was on its way to Bangkok to requisition rice supplies and had left Dili, Portuguese Timor, on 28 April. On 29 April, while in the Flores Sea, the cyclone capsized the ship. (Note: Estimated coordinates: 08°00′S 122°00′E.) Only crew member Paulo do Rosário survived. (Note: Death tolls/occupant counts vary from source to source: The New York Times 1973, p. 26: "... with 19 crew members and five women passengers ... Only one survivor has been found ..."; Marine News, p. 271: "There was one survivor from the 26 persons ..."; Druk Losel 1985, p. 26: "and of the twenty-five people on board including the captain and ..."; Hooke 1989, p. 342: "Twenty-five lives were lost ..."; Padgett 2002: "The Flores Cyclone was responsible for the loss of a ship with 21 lives ..."; Callaghan & Bonell 2005, p. 166: "During April 1973, a tropical cyclone ... sunk a ship with the loss of 21 ..."; Daly 2016, p. 30: "500-ton ship sank, killing 26"; Arif 2021b: "Dari 19 awak dan 5 penumpangnya, hanya satu awaknya yang ditemukan selamat di Pulau Flores.") He was reportedly found clinging to a piece of wood and was taken to Flores by local fishermen where he was cared for. The air forces and navies of Indonesia, Portuguese Timor, Thailand, the United Kingdom, and the United States collaborated in the air-sea search and rescues; however, the searches failed to locate more survivors, with Australian coastal radio stations alerting ships entering the Flores Sea to search for survivors. The sinking was officially announced on 28 May.

=== Indonesia ===
In total, the cyclone killed 1,650 to 1,653 people. On Palue Island alone, the cyclone killed 1,500 fishermen who were fishing at the time of the cyclone's landfall. The storm lashed the coast with a storm surge that broke tens of meters inland, which newspapers described as a "tidal wave". In Ngada Regency, 24 people drowned after being swept away by high waves. Another 10 people were killed in Manggarai Regency, and another 10 in Maumere. Reports described Ngada to be the worst hit area. For three days, the storm dropped heavy rainfall across Flores, which produced deadly landslides and flash flooding that washed away rice fields, livestock, and entire homes. The cyclone wrecked government buildings, schools, homes, dams, and bridges. Heavy damage was reported in the regional capital of Ende, with roads sustaining damages from tidal waves. Around 1,800 houses were levelled with others being badly damaged. Boats that were in the path of the cyclone were destroyed. A Kompas report from June 1973 stated that plantations on the island were destroyed with paddy fields being "ruined". In Palue Island, 1,300 houses were destroyed, representing 80% of houses on the island. Smaller islands around Flores were described as being destroyed.

The storm was described as apocalyptic and was nicknamed the "Flores Death Cyclone".

== Aftermath ==
The Flores cyclone is the deadliest tropical cyclone in the Southern Hemisphere. At the time, losses were estimated to be at around $5 million. News of the disaster in Flores took a month to reach authorities in Jakarta due to lack of communications and the remoteness of the island. The Australian Associated Press wrote that, "Belated reports of disaster in Indonesia are not unusual as communications are virtually non-existent with some of the far-flung islands." It was not uncommon for disasters to only be learned of in Jakarta weeks after they happened. The governor of East Nusa Tenggara (Flores' province) was in Kupang, Timor, near Flores, at the time of the cyclone, and he only received news of the disaster during a visit to Jakarta a month after the cyclone's passage.

Following the cyclone, the Government of Indonesia donated Rp30,000,000 (Note: Equivalent to $180,000 (1973 USD).) to seven regencies on the islands of East Nusa Tenggara, including Flores and Sumba. Bank Negara Indonesia donated Rp250,000 to the victims of the cyclone through the Ministry of Social Affairs. A government relief team accompanied by the Red Cross arrived on the island on 5 June and began damage assessments. The Kompas report from June 1973 noted that locals in Flores were facing a food shortage as food and rice supplies sent to the island were not sufficient. The town of Lela's only hospital was left without water after the cyclone displaced pipes into the sea.

After the floods, the Indonesian government constructed the Sutami Weir, which was finished in 1975. The weir controlled the water flow on the island and helped irrigate 6,500 ha (16,000 acres) of rice paddy fields.

== See also ==
- List of the deadliest tropical cyclones
  - 1970 Bhola cyclone – The deadliest tropical cyclone recorded worldwide
  - Cyclone Idai (2019) – The second deadliest tropical cyclone recorded in the Southern Hemisphere
- Cyclone Inigo (2003) – Caused deadly floods in Indonesia before developing into a tropical cyclone
- Cyclone Seroja (2021) – Another deadly tropical cyclone that struck similar areas
