= Pule =

Pule may refer to:

== People ==
- Pule (given name), South African given name
- Pule (surname), South African surname

== Places ==
- Pule, Guidong County, a town in Guidong County, Hunan Province, China
- Pule, Jatisrono, Indonesia
- Pule, Selogiri, Indonesia

== Other ==
- Pule cheese
- Pule Houser from Histeria!
- Pulē in Hawaiian is defined as prayer, incantation and blessing.
