= Meteorology, Climatology, and Geophysical Agency =

Government agency of Indonesia

- Badan Meteorologi, Klimatologi, dan Geofisika
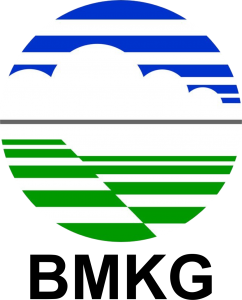

- BMKG headquarters in Kemayoran, Central Jakarta

Agency overview
- Formed: 1866; 160 years ago
- Preceding agencies: Meteorology and Geophysical Agency at Department of Transportation (BMG-DEPHUB) (1980–2002); Meteorology and Geophysical Agency (2002–2008)
- Type: Non-ministerial government body
- Jurisdiction: Government of Indonesia
- Headquarters: Jakarta
- Agency executive: Teuku Faisal Fathani, Head
- Parent department: Department of Transportation (1955-2002)
- Website: www.bmkg.go.id

Meteorology, Climatology, and Geophysical Agency (Indonesian: Badan Meteorologi, Klimatologi, dan Geofisika, abbreviated BMKG) is an Indonesian non-departmental government agency for meteorology, climatology, and geophysics.

== History ==
Its history began on 1841 with individual observation conducted by Dr. Onnen, the head of hospital in Bogor, and was established as a formal government institution on 1866 by the Dutch East Indies government by the name of Magnetic and Meteorological Observatory (Dutch: Magnetisch en Meteorologisch Observatorium). The agency name changed several times and its current name was given on 6 September 2008.

== Tropical Cyclone Warning Center ==
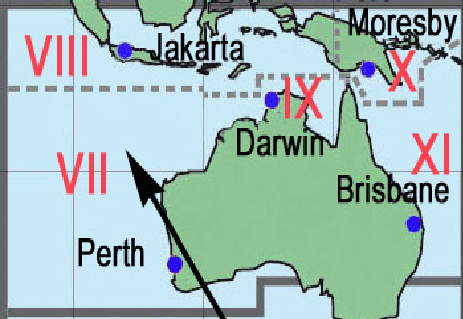
Responsibility zone centers for tropical cyclones in the region.

Since 1986 the BMKG, has run a Tropical Cyclone Warning Center (TCWC), within their headquarters in Jakarta. Over the next 12 seasons, the TCWC named and issued international warnings for the area from the Equator to 10°S between 90°E and 125°E. In 1998, the World Meteorological Organization's RA V Tropical Cyclone Committee recommended that TCWC Perth, in Australia take over warning responsibility on an interim basis until the BMKG's staff had the training to run the TCWC. TCWC Perth then took over the warning and naming responsibilities until the 2007–08 season when they handed it back to TCWC Jakarta. The first depression to be named by TCWC Jakarta came later that year when Cyclone Durga became a Tropical Cyclone within their area of responsibility. During the next two seasons TCWC Jakarta, monitored several tropical cyclones in the North Western Pacific Ocean and the Australian region. At the start of the 2010–11 season, TCWC Jakarta's area of responsibility was then extended out to include the region from the Equator to 10°S between 125°E and 141°E.

== Organization ==
Based on Meteorology, Climatology, and Geophysical Agency Regulation No. 2/2024, the BMKG consisted of:

1. Office of the Head of Meteorology, Climatology, and Geophysical Agency
2. Main Secretariat
  1. Bureau of Planning
  2. Bureau of Law, Public Relation, and Cooperation
  3. Bureau of General Affairs and Finance
  4. Bureau of Human Resources and Organization Affairs
3. Deputy I (Meteorology)
  1. Directorate of Aviation Meteorology
  2. Directorate of Maritime Meteorology
  3. Directorate of Public Meteorology
4. Deputy II (Climatology)
  1. Directorate of Climate Change
  2. Directorate of Applied Climate Services
5. Deputy III (Geophysics)
  1. Directorate of Earthquake and Tsunamis
  2. Directorate of Seismologic Engineering, Potential Geophysics, and Signs
6. Deputy IV (Meteorology, Climatology, and Geophysical Infrastructures)
  1. Directorate of Instrumentation and Calibration
  2. Directorate of Data and Computation
  3. Directorate of Network and Communication Systems
7. Deputy V (Weather Modification)
  1. Directorate of Weather Modification Administration
  2. Directorate of Weather Modification Operations
8. Inspectorate
9. Center for Instrument Standardization of Meteorology, Climatology, and Geophysics
10. Center for Meteorological, Climatological, and Geophysical Human Resource Development
  1. State College of Meteorology, Climatology, and Geophysics
11. Center for Meteorological, Climatological, and Geophysical Functionaries Fostering and Development
12. Indonesian Institute for Meteorology, Climatology, and Geophysics Region I, Medan (serving and managing meteorological, climatological, and geophysical stations in northern half of Sumatra Island)
13. Indonesian Institute for Meteorology, Climatology, and Geophysics Region II, Ciputat (serving and managing meteorological, climatological, and geophysical stations in southern half of Sumatra Island, West Java, Banten, Jakarta, Central Java, Yogyakarta, and West Kalimantan)
14. Indonesian Institute for Meteorology, Climatology, and Geophysics Region III, Denpasar (serving and managing meteorological, climatological, and geophysical stations in East Java, Bali, Central Kalimantan, South Kalimantan, East Kalimantan, North Kalimantan, West Nusa Tenggara, East Nusa Tenggara)
15. Indonesian Institute for Meteorology, Climatology, and Geophysics Region IV, Makassar (serving and managing meteorological, climatological, and geophysical stations in Sulawesi and Maluku Islands)
16. Indonesian Institute for Meteorology, Climatology, and Geophysics Region V, Jayapura (serving and managing meteorological, climatological, and geophysical stations in Papua Island)

Aside of this structure, BMKG maintained 181 meteorological, climatological, and geophysical stations which its operations and management performed by 5 regional Indonesian Institutes for Meteorology, Climatology, and Geophysics (Indonesian: Balai Besar Meteorologi, Klimatologi, dan Geofisika, abbreviated BBMKG) responsible.

== Gallery ==
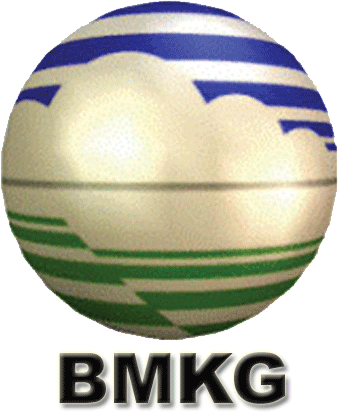
Previous BMKG logo (until 2010)

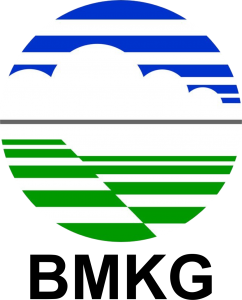
Current logo of BMKG (since 2010)
