= 2018–19 Southern Hemisphere tropical cyclone season =

The 2018–19 Southern Hemisphere tropical cyclone season may refer to one of three different basins and respective seasons:

- 2018–19 South-West Indian Ocean cyclone season, west of 90°E
- 2018–19 Australian region cyclone season, between 90°E and 160°E
- 2018–19 South Pacific cyclone season, east of 160°E

Also, Tropical Storm Iba and Subtropical Storm Jaguar formed in the time period.
