= 2019 hurricane season =

2019 hurricane season may refer to any of the following tropical cyclone seasons

- 2019 Atlantic hurricane season
- 2019 Pacific hurricane season
- 2019 Pacific typhoon season
- 2019 North Indian Ocean cyclone season
- 2018-19 South-West Indian Ocean cyclone season
- 2019-20 South-West Indian Ocean cyclone season
- 2018-19 Australian region cyclone season
- 2018-19 Australian region cyclone season
- 2018-19 South Pacific cyclone season
- 2019-20 South Pacific cyclone season
