= Cyclone Ann =

Category 2 South Pacific and Australian region cyclone in 2019

Tropical Cyclone Ann
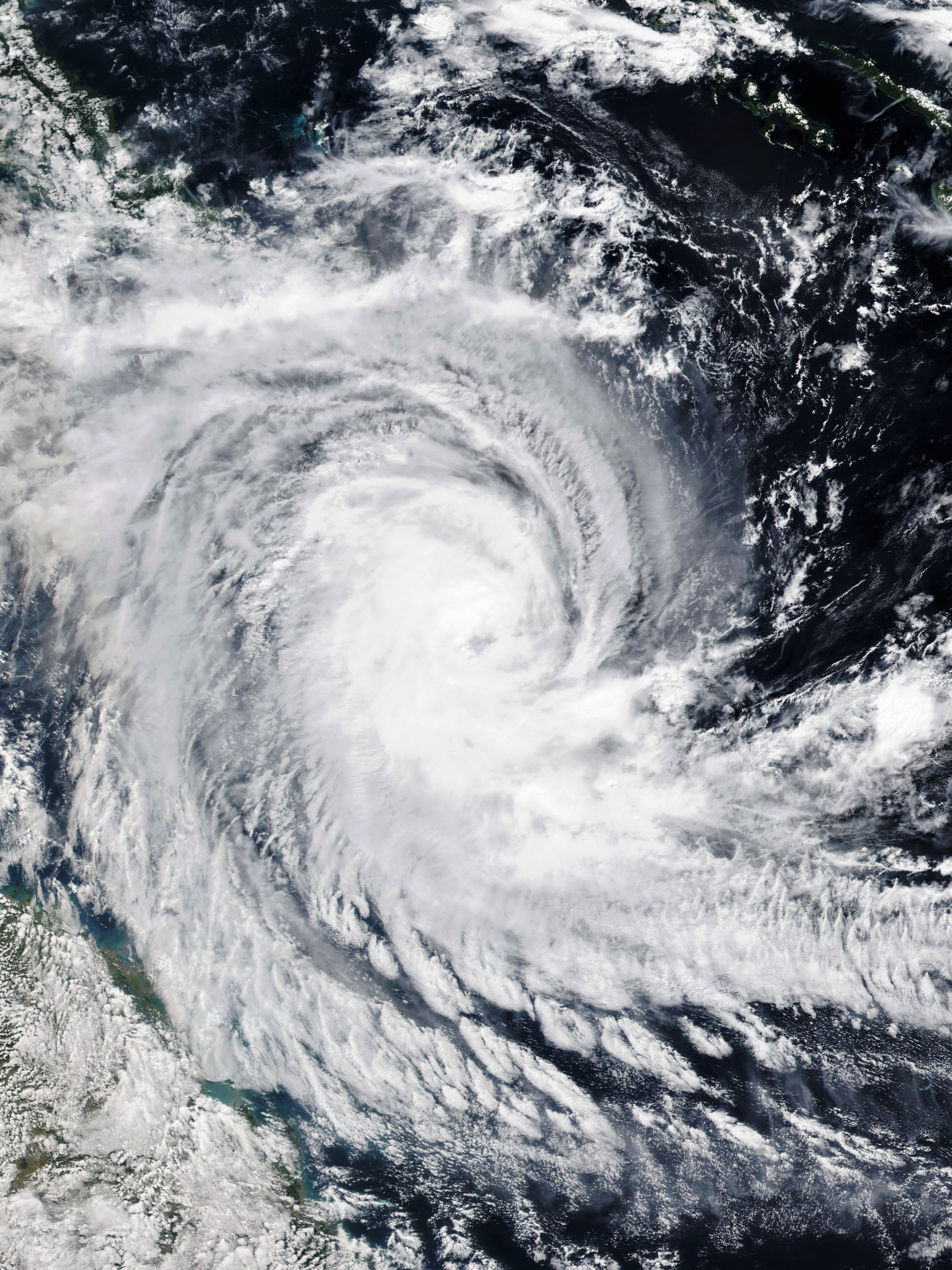
- Tropical Cyclone Ann shortly after peak intensity on 13 May

Meteorological history
- Formed: 7 May 2019
- Remnant low: 14 May 2019
- Dissipated: 18 May 2019

Category 2 tropical cyclone
- 10-minute sustained (BOM)
- Highest winds: 100 km/h (65 mph)
- Highest gusts: 140 km/h (85 mph)
- Lowest pressure: 990 hPa (mbar); 29.23 inHg

Tropical storm
- 1-minute sustained (SSHWS/JTWC)
- Highest winds: 110 km/h (70 mph)
- Lowest pressure: 989 hPa (mbar); 29.21 inHg

Overall effects
- Fatalities: None
- Damage: None
- Areas affected: Solomon Islands, Queensland, Northern Territory, Eastern Indonesia, East Timor
- IBTrACS /
- Part of the 2018–19 South Pacific and Australian region cyclone seasons

Tropical Cyclone Ann was a small off-season tropical cyclone that brought minor impacts to the Solomon Islands, Far North Queensland and coastal regions of the Northern Territory's Top End during May 2019. Ann was the twenty-fifth tropical low, eleventh tropical cyclone, ninth Category 2 tropical cyclone and second off-season tropical cyclone of the 2018–19 Australian region cyclone season. The system developed from a tropical low that formed on 7 May in the South Pacific cyclone region. The low gradually intensified while moving southwards, and strengthened into a tropical cyclone on 11 May. The storm then turned to the west-northwest and continued to strengthen over the Coral Sea. Ann reached peak intensity on 12 May as a Category 2 tropical cyclone on the Australian scale, with 10-minute sustained winds of 100 km/h (65 mph) and a central barometric pressure of 990 hPa (29.23 inHg). One-minute sustained winds of 110 km/h (70 mph) made Ann equivalent to a strong tropical storm on the Saffir–Simpson hurricane wind scale. The storm began to decay soon afterwards, and weakened to a gale-force tropical low on 14 May. Ann made landfall near Lockhart River on Cape York Peninsula on 15 May, before re-emerging over water a few hours later. Ann maintained a steady west-northwestwards track for several days before dissipating as a tropical low near East Timor on 18 May.

Impacts associated with Ann were minor, and no fatalities or damages were attributed to the system. Willis Island experienced marginal gale-force winds as Ann passed nearby on 13 May, and several other islands closer to the Queensland coast experienced similar conditions. Heavy rainfall and gusty winds were experienced in many areas to the south of the remnant tropical low as it made landfall. Precipitation totals exceeding 50 mm (1.97 in) were recorded, with one 24-hour total reaching 93 mm (3.66 in). Increased winds also occurred in coastal areas of the Top End on 15–17 May. By maximum sustained winds, Ann was the strongest entirely off-season tropical cyclone in the Australian region since Alex in 2001, and the strongest to form in the region during May since Rhonda in 1997. Ann was also the first tropical system of any intensity to make landfall in Queensland during the off-season since Zane in 2013.

== Meteorological history ==
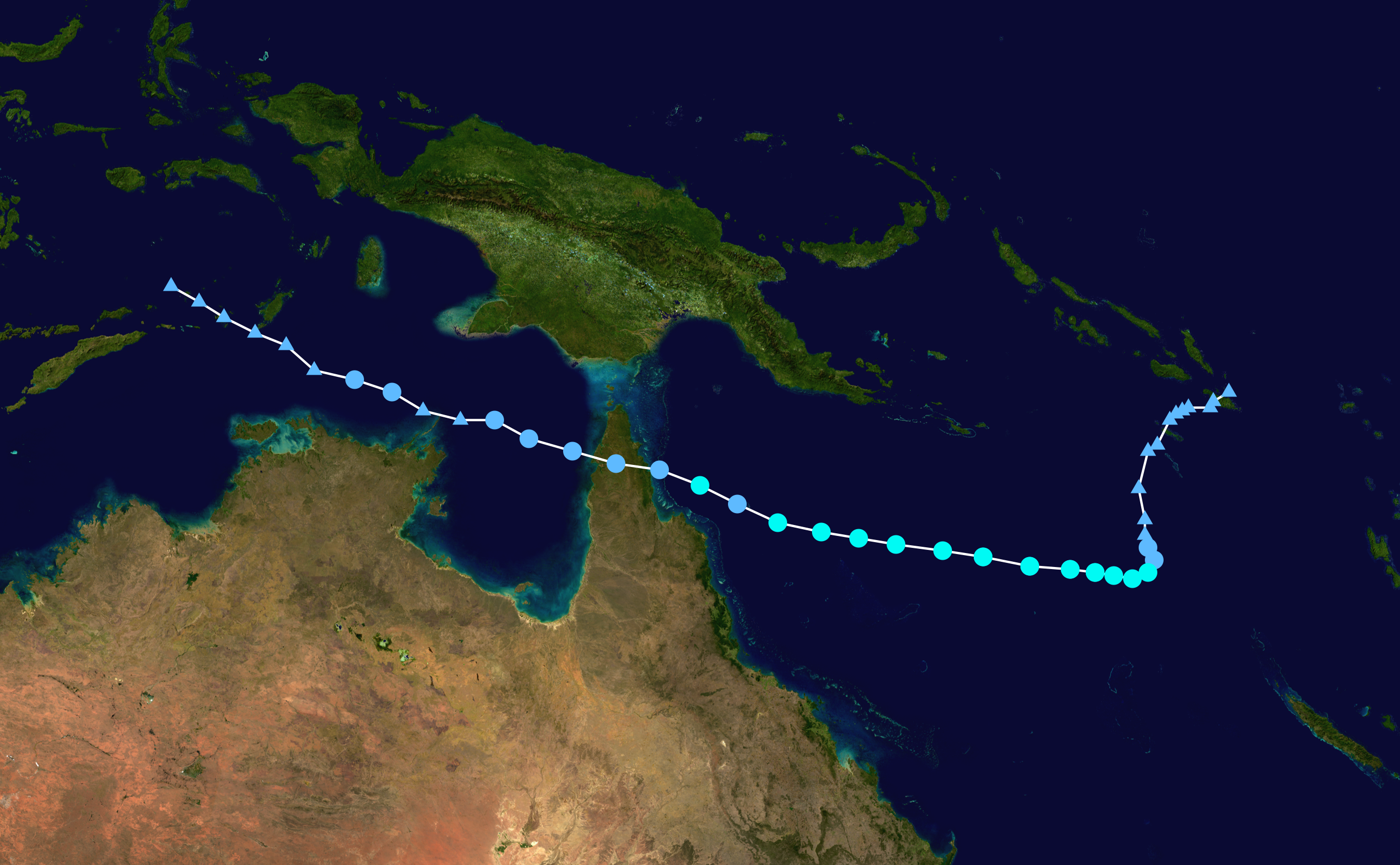
Map plotting the storm's track and intensity, according to the Saffir–Simpson scale Map key Saffir–Simpson scale Tropical depression (≤38 mph, ≤62 km/h) Tropical storm (39–73 mph, 63–118 km/h) Category 1 (74–95 mph, 119–153 km/h) Category 2 (96–110 mph, 154–177 km/h) Category 3 (111–129 mph, 178–208 km/h) Category 4 (130–156 mph, 209–251 km/h) Category 5 (≥157 mph, ≥252 km/h) Unknown Storm type Tropical cyclone Subtropical cyclone Extratropical cyclone, remnant low, tropical disturbance, or monsoon depression

During late April and early May, a strong pulse of the Madden–Julian oscillation tracked eastwards across the tropical Indian Ocean and the Maritime Continent. Despite the traditional Australian wet season having concluded at the end of April, the pulse led to the redevelopment of monsoonal conditions to the north of Australia. Additionally, the presence of the pulse led to environmental conditions which were more favourable for tropical cyclogenesis than normal for the cyclone off-season. As the pulse continued into the Pacific Ocean, the Australian Bureau of Meteorology (BOM) noted the formation of a weak tropical low embedded within a low-pressure trough on 7 May, located within the northwestern South Pacific cyclone region. The BOM assigned the system the identifier code 26U.

The tropical low moved slowly towards the southwest while organisation gradually proceeded in a generally favourable environment. By 00:00 UTC on 8 May, the system was located just to the east of Honiara in the Solomon Islands. After passing over the Solomon Islands, the developing low assumed a more southerly track under the influence of a mid-level high-pressure ridge located to the east. Over the following few days, the tropical low skirted the boundary of the Australian cyclone region and South Pacific cyclone region, passing between the two basins three times in total. By 10 May, disagreement emerged between meteorological agencies regarding the prospect of future development for the system. The BOM anticipated that further development into a tropical cyclone was very unlikely, citing an atmospheric environment that they expected to be unconducive for maintaining a significant tropical system. Conversely, the United States' Joint Typhoon Warning Center (JTWC) analysed the environment to be supportive of tropical cyclogenesis overall, and forecast a gradual strengthening to tropical cyclone intensity over the following days, in accordance with numerical weather prediction model solutions. Aided by warm sea surface temperatures and the favourable outflow provided by an anticyclone in the upper troposphere, deep convection continued to grow over the consolidating low-level circulation centre on 11 May. The storm was upgraded to a Category 1 tropical cyclone on the Australian scale by the BOM at 18:00 UTC on 11 May, while located approximately 1,420 km (880 mi) east of Cairns. Located just within the Australian region at this time, the newly formed cyclone was named Ann by the BOM. The JTWC indicated that Ann had become equivalent to a tropical storm on the Saffir-Simpson hurricane wind scale at this time.

An eastwards-propagating trough in the upper troposphere began to erode the ridge which had been steering the strengthening system southwards. A new mid-level ridge to the south began to develop, causing Ann to accelerate west-northwestwards across the Coral Sea towards Queensland. Environmental conditions remained favourable for development, and the system quickly reached high-end Category 1 intensity at 00:00 UTC on 12 May. Soon afterwards, however, competing environmental influences began to arrest the intensification trend. The cyclone was maintained at Category 1, although the BOM noted that this assessment may have been conservative, with the possibility that the system may have already reached marginal Category 2 intensity. Analysis of satellite imagery indicated that easterly vertical wind shear had begun to increase near the system, and that drier air had started to become entrained into the circulation from the southwest. Ann reached peak intensity at 18:00 UTC on 12 May as a Category 2 tropical cyclone on the Australian scale, generating ten-minute sustained winds of 100 km/h (65 mph) and gusts to 140 km/h (85 mph), with a central barometric pressure of 990 hPa (29.23 inHg). The JTWC reported that one-minute sustained winds reached an estimated 110 km/h (70 mph) at this time, equivalent to a strong tropical storm on the Saffir-Simpson hurricane wind scale.

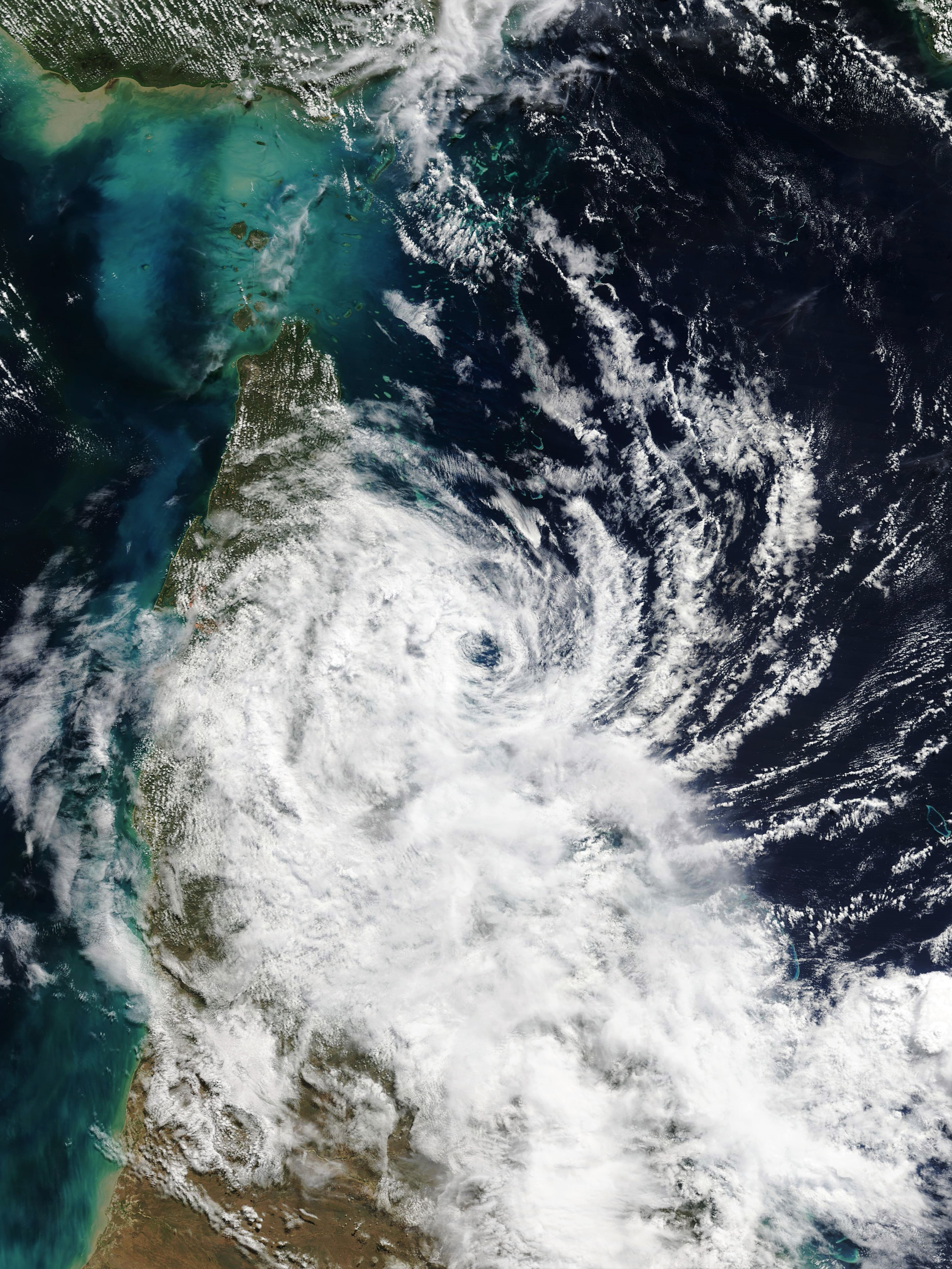
Ex-Tropical Cyclone Ann shortly before landfall near Lockhart River on 15 May, with the exposed low-level circulation centre clearly visible

Ann began to weaken on 13 May. Good poleward outflow provided by the trough had been mitigating the negative effects of other environmental conditions up until this point; however, this had now begun to diminish as the trough receded further eastwards. Dry air intrusion began to damage the storm, disrupting the central deep convection. The BOM downgraded the cyclone to Category 1 at 06:00 UTC on 13 May as the central dense overcast shrunk to less than 20 nautical miles (37 km; 23 mi) in diameter. The BOM once again noted the possibility of underestimating the true intensity of the cyclone due to the very small circulation. The system's decay was evident on satellite imagery, which displayed the effects of dry air, marginal ocean heat content, and increasing wind shear from the previously favourable upper-level anticyclone, now located well to the east. Gale-force winds soon became confined to the southwestern quadrant as the storm became devoid of central deep convection, leaving the low-level circulation centre exposed. With gales no longer extending more than halfway around the system, Ann was downgraded to a tropical low at 03:00 UTC on 14 May. Located 375 km (233 mi) northeast of Cairns, Ex-Tropical Cyclone Ann continued quickly west-northwestwards towards the coast of Far North Queensland. The tropical low made landfall near the town of Lockhart River on the east coast of Cape York Peninsula about 24 hours later, at 2:30 p.m. local time (04:30 UTC) on 15 May.

The tropical low passed quickly over land and emerged over the northeastern Gulf of Carpentaria. Despite the warm sea surface temperatures in the vicinity, unfavourable atmospheric conditions prevented reintensification to tropical cyclone strength. Continuing on the same west-northwestwards track that it had maintained for the previous five days, the tropical low passed the northeastern coast of the Top End on 16 May while moving into the Arafura Sea. After persisting for several days as a remnant tropical low, Ex-Tropical Cyclone Ann eventually dissipated by 06:30 UTC on 18 May in the Banda Sea, while located near East Timor and Indonesia's southern Maluku Islands.

== Preparations ==
In preparation for the possibility of Ann making landfall on the Queensland coast at tropical cyclone intensity, the BOM issued a number of official warnings to the public in advance of the system's arrival. Upon weakening to Category 1 strength at 18:00 UTC on 12 May, a tropical cyclone watch was issued for coastal and inland areas between Cape York and Port Douglas. At this stage, Ann was expected to make landfall as a Category 1 tropical cyclone with sustained winds of 75 kilometres per hour (47 mph). The BOM noted that a storm surge could occur upon landfall, with the potential to cause inundation of low-lying areas along the shoreline. Heavy rainfall was also anticipated, with the possibility of leading to flash flooding. Areas between Coen and Cooktown were placed under a tropical cyclone warning by 18:00 UTC on 13 May, indicating that gale-force winds were expected within 24 hours, with the warning area extended to Lockhart River by 00:00 UTC on 14 May. By this time, cyclone watches for other areas of the coast had been cancelled. Three hours later, however, Ann was downgraded to a tropical low, and all cyclone warnings were cancelled, and it was noted that a significant storm surge was no longer likely.

== Impact ==
Tropical Cyclone Ann brought only minor impacts to Far North Queensland due to weakening to tropical low strength before crossing the coast. Moderate to heavy rainfall was experienced in numerous locations on the southern side of the system, in addition to gusty winds. Some areas between Cairns and Innisfail recorded up to 93 mm (3.66 in) of rainfall in the 24 hours to 9:00 a.m. local time on 15 May (23:00 UTC on 14 May). Rainfall and increased winds were also recorded in coastal regions of the Top End as the remnants of the system passed nearby on 15–17 May. The strongest winds to occur on land areas were on small islands off the Queensland coast. Willis Island, located approximately 450 km (280 mi) east of Cairns, experienced intermittent gale-force winds as Ann passed to the north, peaking at 72 km/h (45 mph) at 19:30 UTC on 13 May. Sustained winds reached only 30 km/h (20 mph) at Lockhart River as the system made landfall.

== See also ==
- List of off-season Australian region tropical cyclones
- Severe Tropical Cyclone Rhonda (1997)—the strongest off-season tropical cyclone on record in the Australian region
- Severe Tropical Cyclone Donna (2017)—the strongest off-season tropical cyclone on record in the South Pacific region
- Tropical Cyclone Liua (2018)—the other off-season tropical cyclone in the 2018–19 South Pacific cyclone season
- Tropical Cyclone Penny (2018)—another storm that affected Lockhart River as a tropical low during the 2018–19 season
- Severe Tropical Cyclone Trevor (2019)—made landfall near Lockhart River as a high-end Category 3 severe tropical cyclone, during the 2018–19 season
- Extremely Severe Cyclonic Storm Fani—the MJO pulse which contributed to Ann's development also contributed to Fani's intensification
