= Cyclone Garance =

South-West Indian Ocean intense tropical cyclone in 2025

Intense Tropical Cyclone Garance
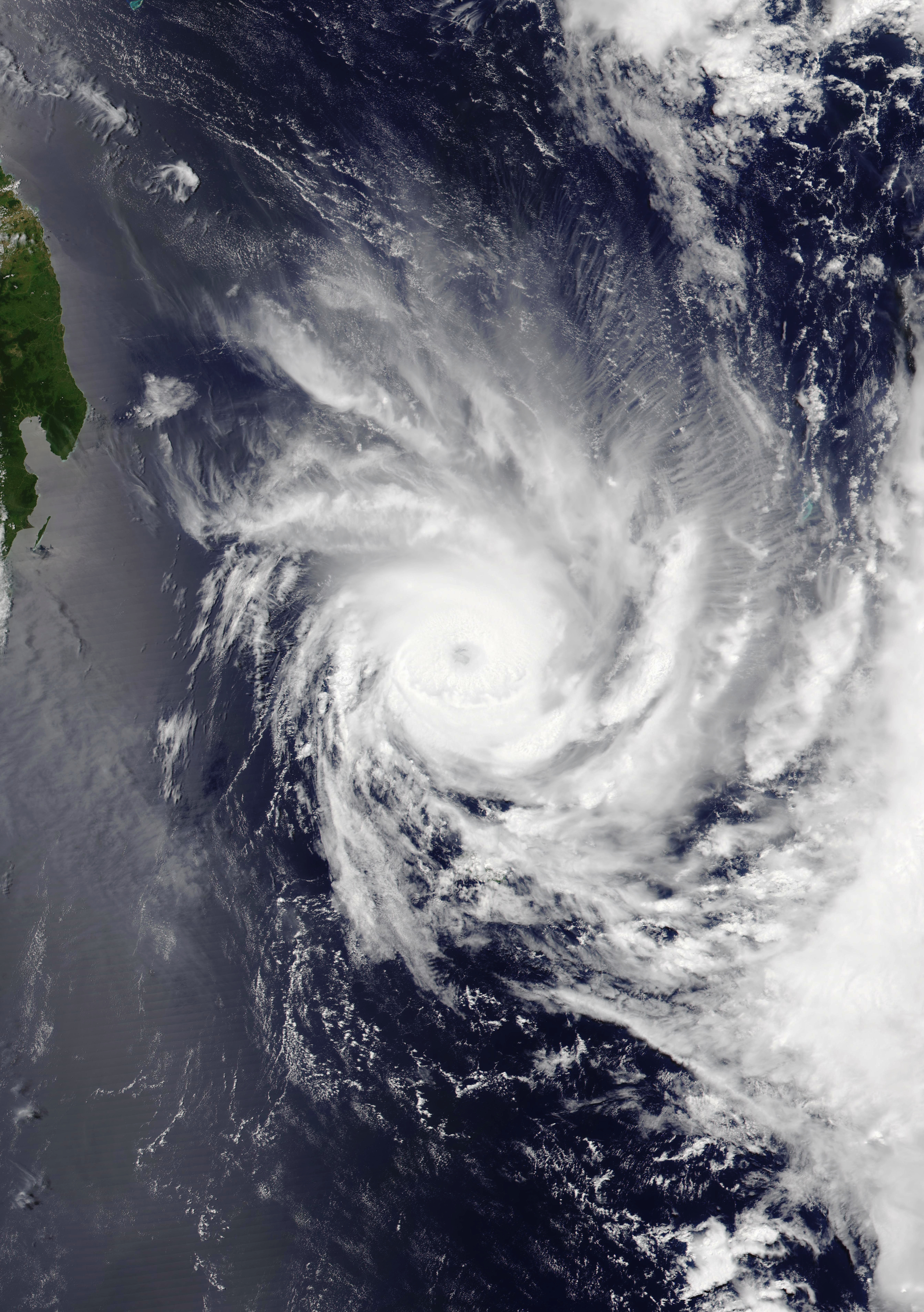
- Garance intensifying north of Réunion on 27 February

Meteorological history
- Formed: 24 February 2025
- Extratropical: 2 March 2025
- Dissipated: 5 March 2025

Intense tropical cyclone
- 10-minute sustained (MFR)
- Highest winds: 175 km/h (110 mph)
- Lowest pressure: 951 hPa (mbar); 28.08 inHg

Category 3-equivalent tropical cyclone
- 1-minute sustained (SSHWS/JTWC)
- Highest winds: 195 km/h (120 mph)
- Lowest pressure: 953 hPa (mbar); 28.14 inHg

Overall effects
- Fatalities: 5
- Injuries: 6
- Damage: $1.05 billion (2025 USD) (Fifth-costliest tropical cyclone in the South-West Indian Ocean basin; costliest in Réunion history)
- Areas affected: Northern Madagascar; Réunion; Mauritius
- Part of the 2024–25 South-West Indian Ocean cyclone season

Intense Tropical Cyclone Garance was a strong tropical cyclone which severely impacted Réunion and Mauritius. The seventh named storm and fifth intense tropical cyclone of the 2024–25 South-West Indian Ocean cyclone season, Garance originated from a tropical disturbance which was spotted on 24 February to the east of Madagascar.

At least five fatalities have been reported in connection to the cyclone. Garance caused US$1.05 billion (€905 million) in damage.

== Meteorological history ==
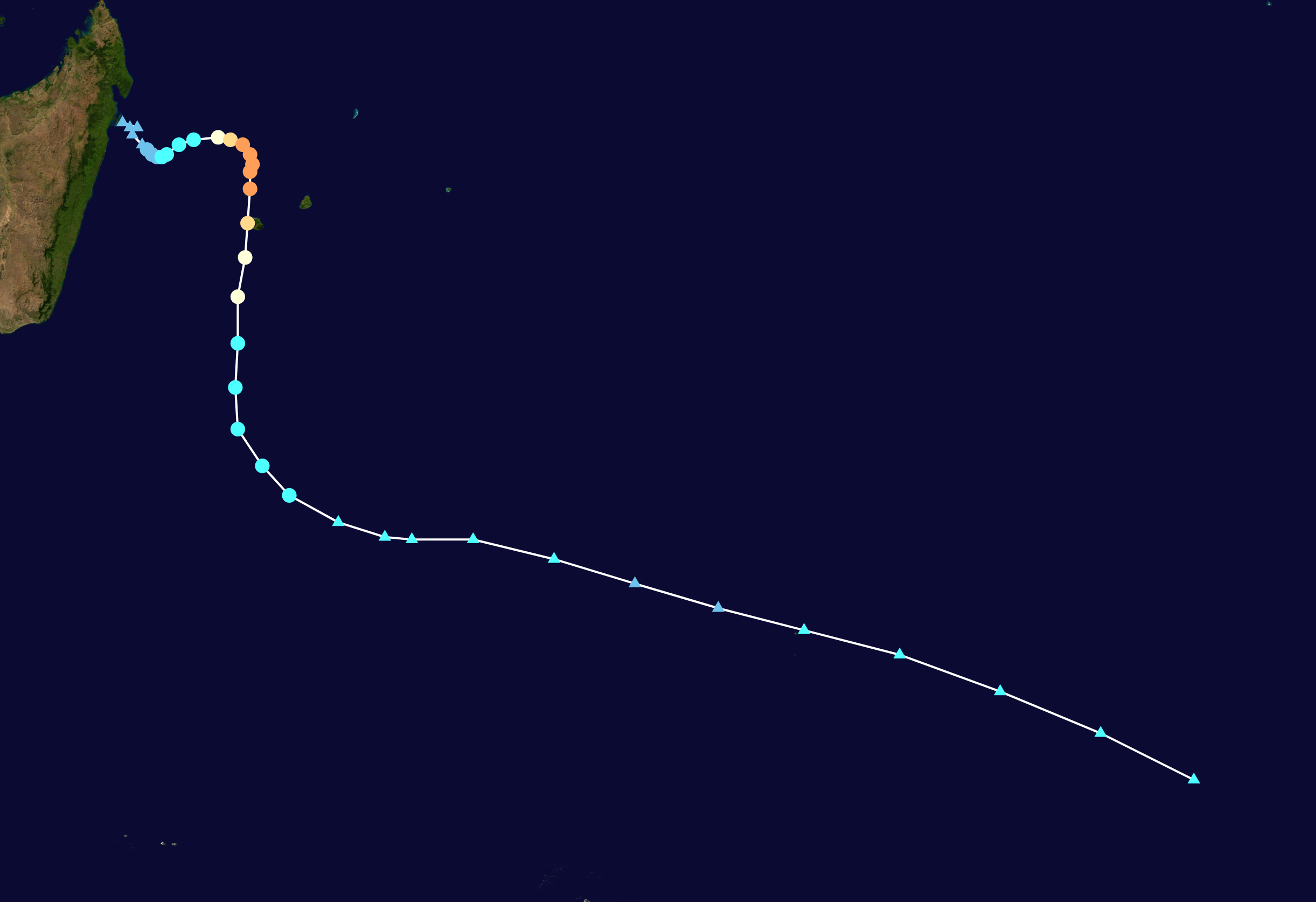
Map plotting the storm's track and intensity, according to the Saffir–Simpson scale Map key Saffir–Simpson scale Tropical depression (≤38 mph, ≤62 km/h) Tropical storm (39–73 mph, 63–118 km/h) Category 1 (74–95 mph, 119–153 km/h) Category 2 (96–110 mph, 154–177 km/h) Category 3 (111–129 mph, 178–208 km/h) Category 4 (130–156 mph, 209–251 km/h) Category 5 (≥157 mph, ≥252 km/h) Unknown Storm type Tropical cyclone Subtropical cyclone Extratropical cyclone, remnant low, tropical disturbance, or monsoon depression

The weak low pressure system called 10 formed on February 24, after several days of development, off the east coast of Madagascar, just over 500 km northwest of Réunion Island. A cyclone warning was issued for Réunion Island and Mauritius by Météo-France La Réunion (MFR). At 00:00 UTC on the 25th, the MFR upgraded the system to a tropical depression. At 10:00 UTC, the tropical depression intensified into a moderate tropical storm and was named Garance by the Malagasy meteorological service.

Continuing to intensify, Garance became a tropical cyclone on February 26 as it moved toward Réunion Island. The latter island was placed on an orange cyclone alert, while Mauritius was upgraded to a Class III cyclone warning. After 00:00 UTC on the 27th, the MFR upgraded the system to an intense cyclone while it was approximately 300 km north of Réunion, equivalent to a Category 3 hurricane on the Saffir-Simpson scale. The alert was raised to red in Réunion (marine submersion, winds, and rain) during the day.

On February 28 at 05:00 UTC, the prefect of Réunion issued a purple alert (a curfew including emergency services, which were no longer permitted to travel except with special authorization), for the second time in the island's history. Around 6:00 UTC, Garance, downgraded to a tropical cyclone, made landfall on the northern coast of the island. The atmospheric pressure in Saint-Denis, near the center of the eye, was 975 hPa, and 10-minute sustained winds were estimated at 85 knots (157 km/h), lower than at its apex. The eye crossed Réunion Island from north to south, from Sainte-Suzanne to Saint-Louis. By 12:00 UTC, the system had downgraded to a severe tropical storm after reaching 130 km south-southwest of the island, and the alert had been lowered to red.

On March 1 at 12:00 UTC, Garance continued to weaken, downgraded to a moderate tropical storm with very reduced convective activity, more than 900 km south of Réunion Island, which was placed in the safeguard phase. At 0600 UTC on March 2, Garance reached colder waters and the MFR issued its final bulletin reclassifying it as a post-tropical cyclone nearly 1,400 km south-southeast of Réunion.

== Preparations and impact ==
Costliest South-West Indian Ocean tropical cyclones
Rank	Tropical cyclones	Season	Damage
1	4 Chido	2024–25	$3.9 billion
2	4 Idai	2018–19	$3.3 billion
3	3 Gezani	2025–26	$2 billion
4	5 Freddy	2022–23	$1.53 billion
5	3 Garance	2024–25	$1.05 billion
6	3 Fytia	2025–26	$475 million
7	4 Enawo	2016–17	$400 million
8	4 Kenneth	2018–19	$345 million
9	4 Leon–Eline	1999–00	$309 million
10	4 Dina	2001–02	$287 million

=== Réunion ===
Ahead of the cyclone, schools were closed in Réunion on the afternoon of 26 February, with a red alert being raised at 19:00 Réunion time the next day. A higher alert – the purple alert – was then issued in Réunion on 28 February as the cyclone neared the island.

At least four people were killed in Réunion due to the cyclone, while two others were reported missing. Garance also left 42% of the island's customers without power.

Cyclone Garance brought extreme weather conditions, with winds gusting to 214 km/h (133 mph), torrential rainfall, and severe flooding across the islands. The destruction has been immense, affecting infrastructure, homes, and essential services. In addition, over a thousand people have been displaced from their homes and are currently being housed in emergency shelters.

=== Mauritius ===
Schools were closed for two days due to the bad weather in Mauritius. Sir Seewoosagur Ramgoolam International Airport was temporarily closed due to these weather conditions.

The cyclone caused adverse weather conditions on the island. High swell warnings were issued, with waves reaching 5 to 7 meters in the open sea, increasing the risk of coastal flooding, particularly on the north and west coasts.

== See also ==
- Tropical cyclones in 2025
- Weather of 2025
- Tropical cyclones in the Mascarene Islands
- Cyclone Belal (2024) – the last tropical cyclone to strike Réunion before Garance
