= Cyclone Hollanda =

South-West Indian cyclone in 1994

Tropical Cyclone Hollanda
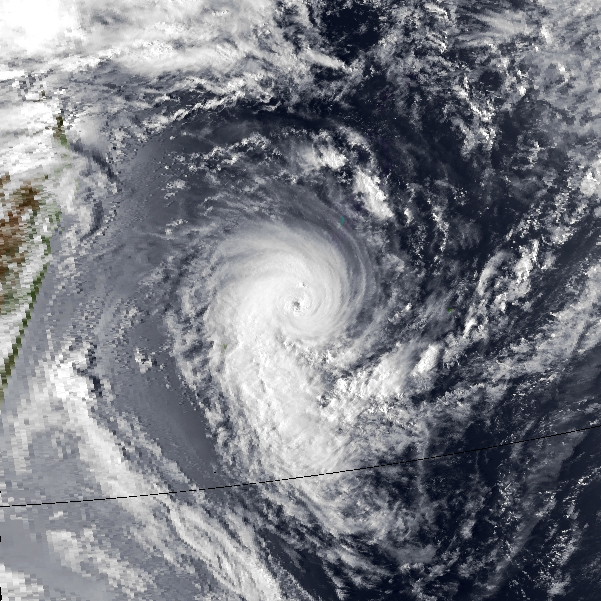
- Cyclone Hollanda near peak intensity

Meteorological history
- Formed: 6 February 1994
- Dissipated: 15 February 1994

Tropical cyclone
- 10-minute sustained (MFR)
- Highest winds: 155 km/h (100 mph)
- Lowest pressure: 940 hPa (mbar); 27.76 inHg

Category 3-equivalent tropical cyclone
- 1-minute sustained (SSHWS/JTWC)
- Highest winds: 195 km/h (120 mph)

Overall effects
- Fatalities: 2 total
- Damage: $135 million (1994 USD)
- Areas affected: Mauritius, Réunion
- IBTrACS
- Part of the 1993–94 South-West Indian Ocean cyclone season

Tropical Cyclone Hollanda was the worst tropical cyclone in Mauritius in 19 years. It formed on 6 February 1994, in the central Indian Ocean in the Southern Hemisphere. The cyclone moved southwestward for much of its duration, striking Mauritius on 10 February at peak intensity with winds of 218 km/h (135 mph). It later passed just southeast of Réunion before turning to the south and weakening. The cyclone became extratropical on 14 February in the southern Indian Ocean.

In Mauritius, Hollanda destroyed or severely damaged 450 houses, which left at least 1,500 people homeless. High winds left half of the island without power, and also caused severe crop damage; nearly half of the island's sugar crop was destroyed, which necessitated for the government to assist in replanting efforts. Hollanda killed 2 people and caused $135 million in damage on Mauritius. About a week after the cyclone struck, Cyclone Ivy also affected the area, although to a lesser degree. The highest rainfall from the cyclone fell on Réunion, with 741 mm (29.2 in) recorded at Grand Coude.

== Meteorological history ==
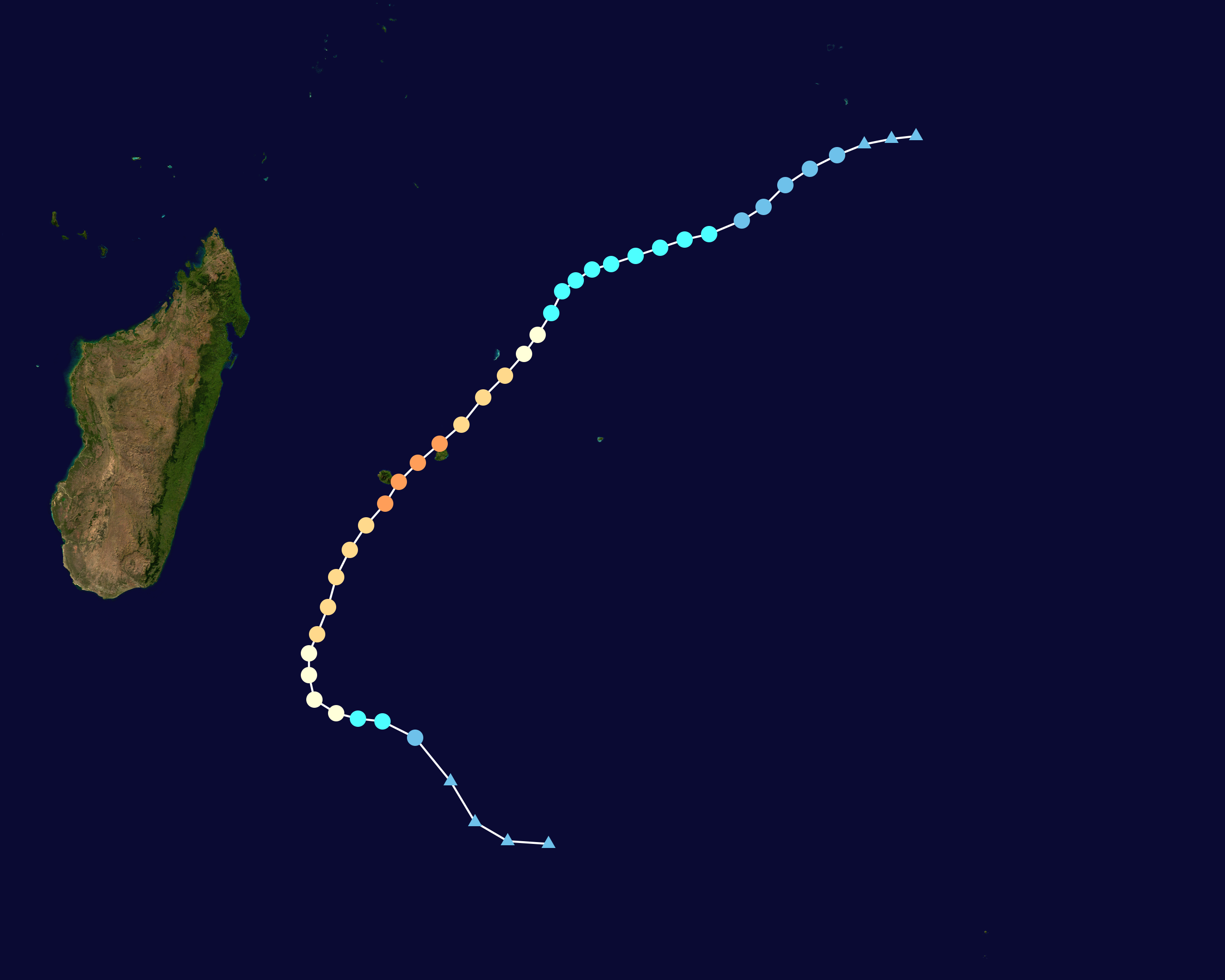
Map plotting the storm's track and intensity, according to the Saffir–Simpson scale Map key Saffir–Simpson scale Tropical depression (≤38 mph, ≤62 km/h) Tropical storm (39–73 mph, 63–118 km/h) Category 1 (74–95 mph, 119–153 km/h) Category 2 (96–110 mph, 154–177 km/h) Category 3 (111–129 mph, 178–208 km/h) Category 4 (130–156 mph, 209–251 km/h) Category 5 (≥157 mph, ≥252 km/h) Unknown Storm type Tropical cyclone Subtropical cyclone Extratropical cyclone, remnant low, tropical disturbance, or monsoon depression

Based on analysis from Météo-France (MFR), a disturbance in the Indian Ocean Intertropical Convergence Zone became evident south of the Chagos Archipelago on 6 February, after Cyclone Geralda struck Madagascar and moved away from the region. The Joint Typhoon Warning Center (JTWC) assessed it as developing a day prior in the same general area. Later that day, a circulation developed concurrently with an area of organized convection. On 8 February, the system intensified into Tropical Storm Hollanda as it moved southwestward, its motion influenced by a ridge to its south. A trough turned the storm to the south-southwest, and Hollanda intensified into a tropical cyclone – the equivalent of a hurricane – on 9 February.

After becoming a tropical cyclone, Hollanda developed a small 20 km (12 mi) eye as it tracked toward the island of Mauritius, located east of Madagascar. Continuing to intensify, the cyclone struck the northern coast of the island at 1800 UTC on 10 February at peak intensity, with winds of 155 km/h (95 mph) (10-minute sustained winds) as assessed by MFR. In addition, the cyclone produced gusts to 230 km/h (140 mph). At the same time, the JTWC estimated peak winds of 195 km/h (120 mph) (1 minute sustained winds). While moving over Mauritius, the eye became disrupted, although Hollanda maintained much of its intensity as it passed just southeast of Réunion early on 11 February. The cyclone remained well-defined as it moved more poleward, and an irregular eye remained visible on satellite imagery. On 13 February, Hollanda turned eastward due to a trough, and the next day it became extratropical over the southern Indian Ocean. Its remnants persisted at least two more days.

== Impact ==
Before Hollanda struck Mauritius, most people were already residing at home, due to the cyclone striking during the Chinese New Year. Officials closed the airport prior to the cyclone's arrival, and most stores and banks were also closed. Officials also ordered for cars to be off the roads during the storm and for people to remain indoors. Forecasters initially expected the storm would remain slightly offshore.

Ultimately, Cyclone Hollanda made landfall at peak intensity, producing wind gusts of 216 km/h (134 mph) in Mauritius's capital city of Port Louis. Strong winds affected the northern and western portions of the island, particularly near the coast, and the cyclone was considered the worst to hit there since Cyclone Gervaise in 1975. In addition to the winds, the storm dropped torrential rainfall that reached 711 mm (28.0 in) in Mare aux Vacoas. Across the island, Hollanda destroyed 290 houses and severely damaged another 160, which left at least 1,500 people homeless. Included among the damaged buildings was the Russian embassy, which faced such difficulties making repairs that the ambassadors moved their offices. Damage to schools was estimated at 25 million rupees ($1.3 million 1994 USD), causing some to be closed for as long as 12 days. High winds downed 30% of the island's trees. Many fell onto power lines, which left 60% of Mauritians without power and about half without telephone service. All external communications were cut to the country during the cyclone. In addition, nearly half of the sugar plantations were destroyed, although the primary industry of tourism was not significantly affected. In total, the cyclone killed two people, and left $135 million in damage (1994 USD); the total included lost productivity, such as decreased sugar output. Less than a week after Hollanda struck, Cyclone Ivy also hit Mauritius, although to a lesser extent than Hollanda. The combined impact caused most roads to be blocked by either fallen trees or mudslides; all main roads were quickly restored.

Following the storm's passage, the Mauritius government opened 130 shelters, and also provided 5,000 rupees to each homeless family. The crop damage from Hollanda, in addition to a drought, decreased the following year's output by 22%. In response, the government provided seeds to farmers so they could replant their crops. Most of the island had their power restored by ten days after the storm. The country's prime minister issued an appeal to the European Union for 67 million rupees ($3.6 million 1994 USD) in assistance, although later dropped it to less than half that total. The requested aid was for the restoration of phone and power utilities. The storm's severe impact on Mauritius caused a sharp drop in the country's gross domestic product (GDP) per capita, and the overall GDP decreased by 10%.

Although the cyclone did not strike the island of Réunion, Hollanda produced strong wind gusts that peaked at 234 km/h (145 mph) in Sainte-Rose. Rainfall on the island peaked at 741 mm (29.2 in) at Grand Coude. The cyclone left damage to crops, power systems, telephones, and the water network, mostly due to the strong winds.

== See also ==
- Tropical cyclones in the Mascarene Islands
- 1892 Mauritius cyclone – powerful cyclone that largely destroyed Mauritius
- Cyclone Dina – strong cyclone in 2002 that also affected Mauritius
