= Tropical cyclones in the Mascarene Islands =

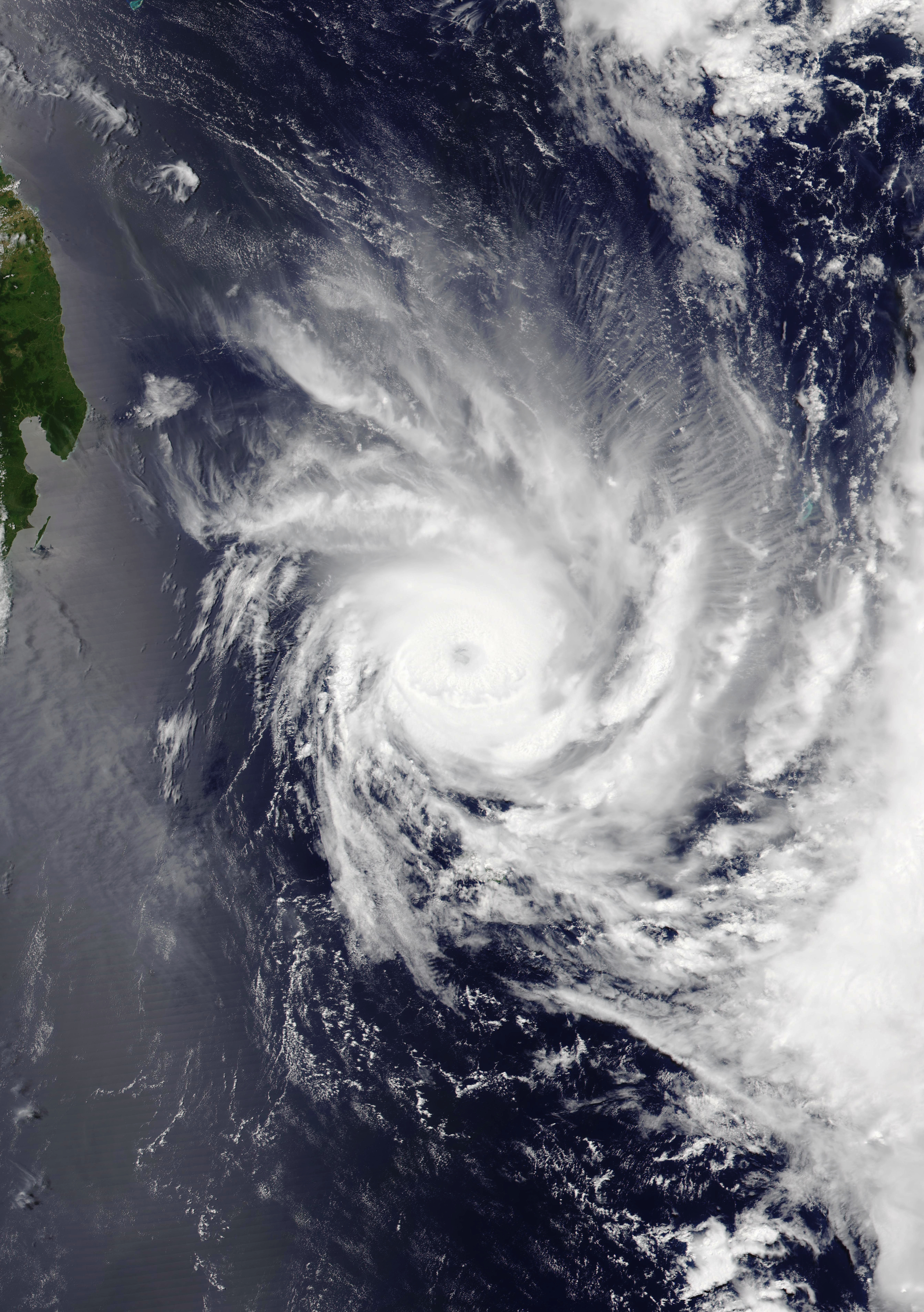
Satellite image of Cyclone Garance, the most recent tropical cyclone to pass near the Mascarene Islands

Since 1656, at least 300 tropical cyclones have affected the Mascarene Islands in the southern Indian Ocean. The archipelago consists of several islands, including Mauritius, Réunion, and Rodrigues. Mauritius claims responsibility for several Outer Islands, including St. Brandon and Agaléga, and has disputed territorial claims of Tromelin Island and the Chagos Archipelago. The deadliest tropical cyclone to affect the region was one that struck Mauritius in 1892, which killed 1,200 people, left 50,000 people homeless, and destroyed one-third of the capital Port Louis.

Since 1950, there have been 262 human fatalities related to tropical cyclones in the Mascarene Islands. The deadliest storms since then were cyclones Carol in 1960, which killed 42 on Mauritius, and Jenny in 1962, which killed 17 on Mauritius and 32 on Réunion. The storms' close succession led to improved building codes. All known worldwide tropical cyclone precipitation records occurred on Réunion. This included a storm in 1958 that dropped 2,467 mm (97.1 in) of rainfall at Aurere over 48 hours. During a 24-hour period in January 1966, Cyclone Denise dropped 1,825 mm (71.9 in) of rainfall at Foc Foc, of which 1,144 mm (45.0 in) fell over 12 hours; both precipitation totals set records for their respective durations. In 1968, Cyclone Monique produced the highest wind gust on Rodrigues – 276 km/h (171 mph) at a station in the mountainous interior. The highest recorded wind gust on Mauritius – 280 km/h (170 mph) at Mon Desert – occurred when Cyclone Gervaise struck the island in February 1975; the cyclone killed 10 people on the island and caused about US$200 million in damage.

During the 1980s, 27 cyclones affected the archipelago, beginning with Cyclone Hyacinthe, the wettest tropical cyclone on record after it dropped 6,083 mm (239.5 in) of rainfall over 14 days in January 1980 at Commerson Crater in the mountainous peaks of Réunion. In 1989, Cyclone Firinga caused US$217 million in damage from its high wind gusts. In the 1990s, 34 storms affected the Mascarene Islands, most notably Cyclone Bella in 1990, which damaged or destroyed 1,500 homes on Rodrigues, as well as Cyclone Hollanda, which caused the Mauritius gross domestic product to decline by 10%. Since 2000, 64 storms affected the archipelago. In 2002, Cyclone Dina produced the highest wind gusts on Réunion, reaching 277 km/h (172 mph). Cyclone Gamede dropped record rainfall over a four-day period in 2007, when Commerson Crater in Réunion's mountainous interior recorded 4,869 mm (191.7 in) of rainfall, breaking the world record for the most precipitation recorded over 72 hours and 96 hours, set previously during Cyclone Hyacinthe in 1980. The most recent storm to affect the island group was Cyclone Garance in February 2025.

== Background and climatology ==
The Mascarene Islands are located in the Indian Ocean east of Madagascar. The island group has been known to the Arab world since the 10th century, and to Europeans since the 16th century. In 1638, the Dutch started a colony on Mauritius, but abandoned it after a severe cyclone struck in 1695. The French settled nearby Réunion in 1655, and colonized Mauritius in 1715, naming it Isle de France. During the Napoleonic Wars, the British took over Mauritius, maintaining possession of the island until 1968 when Mauritius became independent. The British also briefly took possession of Réunion from 1810 to 1815, until it was returned to France, which operates the island as an overseas department.

According to a study from 1989, on average two storms pass within 320 km (200 mi) of Réunion or Mauritius each year, with a landfall about every five years.

== List of storms ==
=== Pre-1800s ===
- 1615 – A storm on Mauritius wrecked the ship Peter's Booth.
- February 9, 1695 – A powerful cyclone struck Mauritius, destroying much of the island.
- January 25, 1710 – A powerful cyclone struck Mauritius, sinking a boat that was intended to evacuate the island's Dutch population. Residents drowned while crossing streams to reach a ship on the other side of the island.
- December 23, 1723 – A powerful cyclone affected Mauritius.
- February 4, 1731 – The public archives in Mauritius were destroyed by a passing cyclone.
- March 13, 1734 – A powerful cyclone passed near Mauritius.
- March 8, 1743 – A strong cyclone passed near Mauritius.
- February 1748 – A strong storm

=== 1800s ===
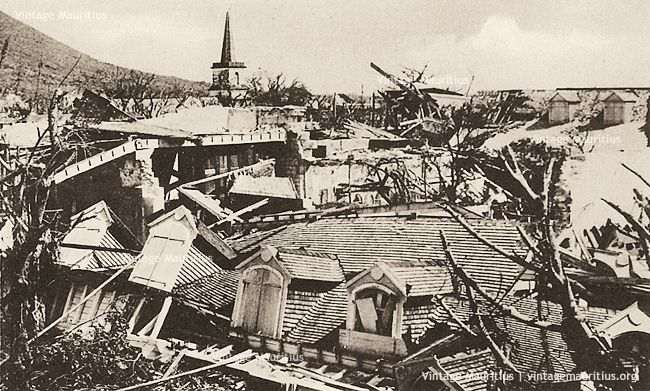
Damage from a cyclone in 1892 in Mauritius

- February 1800
- 1806 – A storm affected Mauritius during the year.
- February 3, 1807 –
- February 26, 1807 –
- March 6, 1811 –
- March 21, 1811 –
- February 26, 1812 –
- February 19, 1813 –
- February 3, 1814 –
- April 19, 1814 –
- February 6, 1815 –
- February 17, 1815 –
- January 22, 1816 –
- February 14, 1817 –
- March 1, 1818 – A cyclone passed near Mauritius, where a barometric pressure of 950 mbar (28 inHg) was recorded; this was one of the earliest reports of atmospheric pressure associated with a tropical cyclone in the region.
- January 25, 1819 –
- March 29, 1819 –
- December 15, 1820 –
- February 21, 1823 –
- March 6, 1823 –
- February 23, 1824 –
- April 11, 1824 –
- December 6, 1824 –
- March 10, 1825 –
- February 24, 1826 –
- December 27, 1826 –
- January 8, 1827 –
- March 6, 1828 –
- March 25, 1828 –
- February 7, 1829 –
- March 27, 1830 –
- April 4, 1830 –
- March 4, 1832 –
- April 10, 1833 –
- January 20, 1834 –
- February 21, 1834 –
- April 30, 1834 –
- January 20, 1835 –
- March 5, 1836 –
- February 15, 1837 –
- April 10, 1840 –
- January 16, 1841 –
- January 16, 1843 –
- April 1843 – Rodrigues
- January 4, 1844 –
- February 20, 1844 –
- March 20, 1844 –
- December 20, 1844 –
- March 8, 1845 –
- January 28, 1847 –
- February 1847 – On an unknown date, a cyclone affected Mauritius.
- March 8, 1848 –
- February 28, 1850 –
- March 20, 1851 –
- January 9, 1852 –
- January 23, 1852 –
- January 14, 1853 –
- March 5, 1853 –
- February 10, 1854 –
- January 22, 1855 –
- April 27, 1855 –
- February 2, 1856 –
- April 3, 1856 –
- December 1857
- 1879 – 35 deaths
- April 29, 1892 – A powerful cyclone killed 1,200 people and injured 4,000 others on Mauritius. For 65 minutes, the eyewall of the storm moved across the island, producing sustained winds of 195 km/h (121 mph), gusts of 216 km/h (134 mph), and a barometric pressure of 947 mbar (28.0 inHg). In about six hours, the cyclone knocked down 200,000 trees, left 50,000 people homeless, and wrecked about one-third of the capital Port Louis.
- January 12, 1895 –

=== 1900s ===
- March 21, 1904 – A cyclone struck Réunion's capital, killing 24 people.
- March 5, 1931 – wind gusts 156 km/h (97 mph)
- February 4, 1932 – A small but powerful storm crossed Réunion, leaving around 100 deaths.
- January 16, 1945 – A cyclone struck Mauritius, producing wind gusts of 153 km/h (95 mph). 13 deaths
- February 1, 1945 – A cyclone passed south of Mauritius, where wind gusts reached 150 km/h (93 mph).
- April 7, 1945 – The eye of a cyclone struck Réunion, producing wind gusts of over 200 km/h (120 mph). The storm killed 13 people and left over F300 million (US$6 million) in damage.
- January 30, 1946 – A cyclone passed near Mauritius, producing wind gusts of 129 km/h (80 mph).
- January 26, 1948 – A cyclone struck 165 deaths, wind gusts estimated –

=== 1950s ===
- March 17, 1952 1870 mm
- April 6–9, 1958 – A cyclone passed about 80 km (50 mi) west of Réunion, dropping 2,467 mm (97.1 in) of rainfall at Aurere over 48 hours; the total set record the highest precipitation amount worldwide for that amount of time.

=== 1960s ===
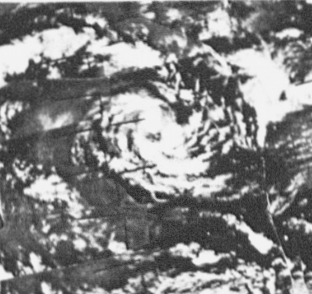
Satellite image of Tropical Storm Kathleen in 1965, part of the first complete view of Earth from satellite imagery. The storm would affect Rodrigues three days later.

- January 19, 1960 – Cyclone Alix passed between Réunion and Mauritius, producing wind gusts of 200 km/h (120 mph). Alix killed eight people on Mauritius and injured more than 100 others. The cyclone destroyed more than 20,000 huts and buildings, leaving 21,000 people homeless.
- February 27, 1960 – Cyclone Carol struck Mauritius, producing wind gusts of 256 km/h (159 mph), the strongest on record at the time and only surpassed by Cyclone Gervaise in 1975. Carol killed 42 people on Mauritius and seriously injured 95 others. The storm destroyed or seriously damaged about 100,000 houses, leaving over 15% of the island's population homeless, or over 100,000 people, of whom 70,000 stayed in emergency shelters. The high winds also wrecked about 60% of the sugar crop. Storm damage was estimated at RS450 million (US$95 million).
- December 25, 1961 – Cyclone Beryl passed just west of Mauritius, producing wind gusts of 171 km/h (106 mph), Later, the storm struck Réunion
- February 28, 1962 – Cyclone Jenny brushed the north coast of Mauritius, producing wind gusts of 235 km/h (146 mph). On the island, the storm killed 17 people, destroyed 1,300 buildings, and left more than 8,000 people homeless. Later that day, the storm struck Réunion, killing 36 people; wind gusts at the Roland Garros Airport reached 250 km/h (160 mph). Jenny destroyed 3,851 homes on Réunion and severely damaged another 2,619, many of them wooden, leaving about 20,000 people homeless. The storm also destroyed crops, and wrecked about 80% of the island's telephone lines. After the close succession of Carol and Jenny, officials rebuilt most homes with concrete to withstand future storms.
- April 9, 1962 – Cyclone Maud passed near Rodrigues, producing wind gusts of 250 km/h (160 mph).
- October 13, 1962 – Weakening Tropical Storm Amy passed north of Rodrigues, producing hailstorms on the island. The storm also dropped heavy rainfall and produced moderate waves on Réunion.
- December 4, 1962 – Cyclone Bertha passed between Mauritius and Rodrigues, producing gusty winds.
- December 25, 1962 – Tropical Storm Cecile produced winds of 93 km/h (58 mph) while passing just east of St. Brandon.
- January 14, 1963 – Cyclone Delia brushed St. Brandon with 88 km/h (55 mph) wind gusts. The cyclone also produced high seas along the Mascarenes while exiting the region.
- February 10, 1963 – Developing Tropical Storm Fanny produced gusty winds and high seas in St. Brandon and Réunion before striking Madagascar.
- February 19, 1963 – Tropical Storm Grace passed just west of Rodrigues, bringing wind gusts of 100 km/h (62 mph).
- March 4, 1963 – Tropical Storm Irene brought gusty winds to St. Brandon and Tromelin while developing and exiting the region.
- March 9, 1963 – Cyclone Julie brushed Rodrigues with gusty winds while passing east of the island.
- December 24, 1963 – Tropical Storm Betty brushed St. Brandon with wind gusts of 81 km/h (50 mph).
- January 20, 1964 – Cyclone Danielle crossed between Réunion and Mauritius, producing wind gusts of 219 km/h (136 mph) in the latter island. Over three days, the storm dropped heavy rainfall, reaching 795 mm (31.3 in).
- February 6, 1964 – Tropical Storm Eileen passed between Réunion and Madagascar, producing increased winds in the Mascarenes.
- February 28, 1964 – Cyclone Giselle passed just northwest of Réunion, producing wind gusts of 180 km/h (110 mph), and heavy rainfall. Over four days, rainfall accumulated to 2,708 mm (106.6 in) at Belouve, of which 1,689 mm (66.5 in) fell over 24 hours. The rains caused flooding damage to crops.
- March 5, 1964 – Tropical Storm Harriet passed north of the Mascarenes and near St. Brandon, generating gusty winds on the islands.
- April 30, 1964 – Tropical Storm Jose brought gusty winds to Rodrigues while passing to its north.
- December 5, 1964 – Tropical Disturbance Arlette produced increased winds while passing near St. Brandon, Mauritius, and Rodrigues.
- December 9, 1964 – Tropical Storm Bessie brought gusty winds to St. Brandon, Réunion, and Mauritius.
- January 7, 1965 – Cyclone Freda passed between Rodrigues and Mauritius, generating wind gusts of 160 km/h (99 mph) on Rodrigues.
- January 17, 1965 – Developing Tropical Storm Iris produced wind gusts of 80 km/h (50 mph) on Tromelin.
- February 6, 1965 – Tropical Depression Judy developed and remained north of the Mascarenes, generating high waves.
- February 16, 1965 – Tropical Storm Kathleen passed southeast of Rodrigues, generating high waves that reached 3.5 m (11 ft) along the island's southern coast.
- March 4, 1965 – Tropical Depression Olive passed south of Rodrigues. It produced high seas and scattered thunderstorms as far west as Réunion.
- May 3, 1965 – Tropical Storm Rose passed west of Réunion, producing wind gusts of 65 km/h (40 mph), along with heavy rainfall reaching 635 mm (25.0 in) at Plaine des Palmistes. The rains caused a landslide along the Rivière des Remparts.
- January 7, 1966 – Cyclone Denise passed north of Mauritius, producing wind gusts of 170 km/h (110 mph). Later, the storm crossed over Réunion, dropping record rainfall. Over a 24-hour period, Denise dropped 1,825 mm (71.9 in) of rainfall at Foc Foc, Réunion, of which 1,144 mm (45.0 in) fell over 12 hours; both precipitation totals are the highest recorded worldwide for their respective durations. Over 48 hours, precipitation totaled 2,230 mm (88 in) at Bras Sec. The heavy rains caused flooding that killed three people, and caused severe road and crop damage.
- March 5, 1966 – Cyclone Ivy brushed St. Brandon with 93 km/h (58 mph) winds, and later passed between Madagascar and Réunion.
- December 17, 1966 – Tropical Storm Colette passed south west of Réunion, producing heavy rainfall on the island.
- January 14, 1967 – Cyclone Gilberte brushed Mauritius and Réunion with heavy rainfall and gusty winds, reaching 140 km/h (87 mph) on Mauritius.
- February 12, 1967 – Tropical Storm Huguette produced 60 km/h (37 mph) winds while passing east of Rodrigues.
- December 23, 1967 – Cyclone Carmen passed just west of Rodrigues, producing heavy rainfall and wind gusts of 216 km/h (134 mph). The storm also dropped rainfall on Réunion.
- January 21, 1968 – Cyclone Henriette passed just east of Rodrigues, producing 165 km/h (103 mph) wind gusts.
- January 30, 1968 – After emerging from Madagascar, Cyclone Georgette brought heavy, but beneficial rainfall to Réunion.
- February 13, 1968 – Tropical Storm Ida brought gusty winds to Mauritius, as well as beneficial rainfall to Réunion.
- March 10, 1968 – Tropical Storm Karine bypassed Réunion, bringing heavy rainfall that caused river flooding. Six people drowned on the island during the storm's passage.
- March 29, 1968 – The eye of Cyclone Monique passed just northwest of Rodrigues, producing a minimum pressure of 933 mbar (27.6 inHg), as well as wind gusts of 276 km/h (171 mph) in the island's interior; this was the highest wind gust on record for the island. The winds wrecked most of the island's crops, as well as many houses, while also causing severe erosion. The outskirts of Monique also produced high waves and dropped rainfall in Réunion. Damage from Carmen and Monique was estimated at US$5 million, with 3,500 people left homeless and 24 people injured.
- November 1, 1968 – High waves from Tropical Storm Annie affected the north and east coast of Réunion.
- January 1, 1969 – Tropical Storm Berthe passed north of the Mascarene Islands, bringing light rainfall and gusty winds to the islands.
- January 16, 1969 – A trough related to Tropical Storm Claire brought rainfall to Réunion for several days, which peaked at 252.4 mm (9.94 in) in La Confiance.
- February 1, 1969 – Cyclone Dany passed north of the Mascarene Islands, bringing heavy rainfall to Réunion that reached 597 mm (23.5 in) at Foc Foc. The rains damaged coastal roads, and contributed to two deaths.
- March 23, 1969 – Cyclone Helene passed east of Mauritius, resulting in several days of rainfall and rough seas for the Mascarene Islands.

=== 1970s ===
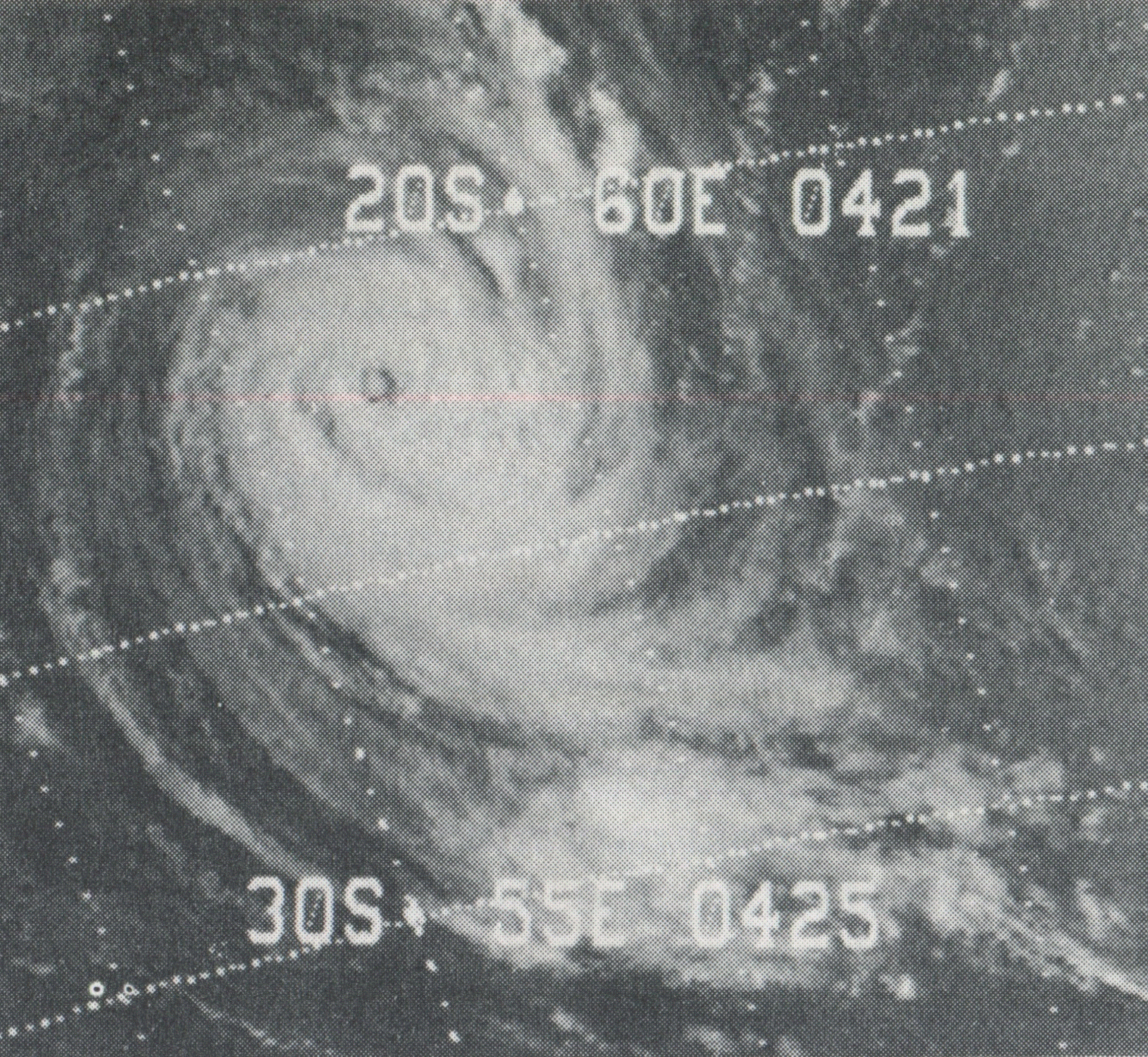
Satellite image of Cyclone Geraise in 1975

- January 12, 1970 – Cyclone Genevieve passed north of Réunion, bringing heavy rainfall to the island's northern portion.
- January 25, 1970 – Tropical Storm Hermine dropped heavy rainfall on Réunion over four days, reaching 866 mm (34.1 in). The rains flooded roads and crops, killing one person.
- February 11, 1970 – Cyclone Iseult passed between Réunion and Mauritius.
- March 29, 1970 – Cyclone Louise passed east of Mauritius, producing wind gusts of 157 km/h (98 mph), and the storm later brushed Rodrigues.
- January 25, 1971 – Cyclone Ginette looped south of Réunion, resulting in high waves and several days of rainfall.
- January 31, 1971 – Cyclone Felicie emerged from the east coast of Madagascar, bringing thunderstorms to Réunion.
- February 8, 1971 – Cyclone Helga passed southeast of Réunion and Mauritius, bringing heavy rainfall to the former island, reaching 926 mm (36.5 in) at Commerson. Two people died on the island due to drowning.
- February 26, 1971 – Cyclone Lise passed southeast of Rodrigues, and later produced rainfall in Réunion.
- December 16, 1971 – Rainbands from Tropical Storm Agnes affected Réunion while the storm passed to the north.
- February 7, 1972 – Tropical Storm Dolly brushed the southwest coast of Réunion, bringing days of heavy rainfall that reached 774 mm (30.5 in) at Piton Tortue. The rains damaged crops and flooded coastal roads. Dolly killed five people on the island.
- February 13, 1972 – Cyclone Eugenie brought beneficial rainfall to the Mascarene Islands while passing to the north.
- February 18, 1972 – Cyclone Fabienne passed just west of Rodrigues, producing wind gusts of 254 km/h (158 mph). The storm caused two fatalities on the island, as well as 16 injuries.
- March 5, 1972 – Strengthening Tropical Storm Hermione passed north of the Mascarene Islands, producing heavy rainfall on Réunion that reached 757.5 mm (29.82 in) at Foc Foc.
- November 30, 1972 – Tropical Storm Ariane passed north of Mauritius and later executed a loop southeast of the island. The storm brought heavy rainfall and wind gusts of 92 km/h (57 mph).
- December 22, 1972 – Cyclone Beatrice brushed northern Rodrigues and eastern Mauritius, bringing rainfall.
- January 8, 1973 – Tropical Storm Charlotte passed just southwest of Réunion, producing 102 km/h (63 mph) wind gusts, as well as heavy rainfall reaching 813 mm (32.0 in) at Riviere de L'Est. The rains damaged crops and flooded roads, which killed one person due to drowning.
- January 13, 1973 – Tropical Storm Dorothee produced a series of thunderstorms on Réunion while the storm passed to the southwest.
- January 31, 1973 – Cyclone Gertrude brushed eastern Rodrigues, producing 169 km/h (105 mph), as well as 296.4 mm (11.67 in) of rainfall.
- February 2, 1973 – Tropical Storm Hortense passed south of Réunion, bringing rainfall to the island.
- February 21, 1973 – Cyclone Jessy struck Rodrigues, bringing heavy rainfall and 221 km/h (137 mph) wind gusts, causing power outages.
- March 1, 1973 – Cyclone Kitty struck Rodrigues, causing power outages.
- March 10, 1973 – Cyclone Lydie passed west of Réunion, producing 162 km/h (101 mph) wind gusts in the mountainous peaks. The cyclone produced four days' of heavy rainfall on the island, reaching 655 mm (25.8 in). Flooding killed 10 people on the island, and caused crop damage.
- September 21, 1973 – Tropical Storm Alice produced high waves, flooding half of Île Raphael, while high winds damaged the radio antenna and roofing of the island's meteorological station.
- January 3, 1974 – Tropical Storm Esmeralda looped to the southeast of Madagascar, bringing several days of rainfall to Réunion, reaching 222.2 mm (8.75 in).
- February 27, 1974 – High waves from Tropical Storm Ghislaine affected southeastern Rodrigues.
- January 24, 1975 – Cyclone Deborah brushed the coast of Réunion with scattered thunderstorms while passing to the south of the island.
- February 6, 1975 – Cyclone Gervaise struck Mauritius, where the calm of the eye lasted about three hours. The storm killed 10 people on the island and caused about US$200 million in damage. Gervaise produced wind gusts of 280 km/h (170 mph) at Mon Desert, the highest ever recorded on Mauritius. The storm destroyed about 13,000 houses, and also caused heavy damage to crops, power lines, and roads.
- March 16, 1975 – Cyclone Ines passed between Réunion and Mauritius, dropping heavy rainfall on both islands. Flooding rains destroyed several rain gauges on Réunion.
- January 20, 1976 – Cyclone Danae destroyed the wind gauge while passing just south of Agaléga; winds were estimated at over 240 km/h (150 mph). The storm also produced high waves that affected the northern coast of Réunion, flooding coastal roads.
- January 8, 1977 – Cyclone Clarence passed near St. Brandon, producing high waves that destroyed four boats and several homes. Wind gusts on the island reached 169 km/h (105 mph). For several days moved in a counterclockwise track around the Mascarene Islands, producing high waves and beneficial rainfall on Réunion.
- January 31, 1977 – Tropical Storm Emilie passed north of Réunion, bringing beneficial rainfall for crops.
- February 6, 1977 – Cyclone Fifi approached but turned away from western Réunion, bringing three days' of rainfall that reached 2,027 mm (79.8 in) at Salazie. Flooding damaged crops and roads, and one person died while attempting to cross an inundated road.
- February 8, 1977 – Tropical Storm Gilda passed between Rodrigues and St. Brandon, and later between Mauritius and Réunion, before being absorbed by Cyclone Fifi, causing minimal effects.
- February 20, 1977 – Cyclone Hervea passed just south of Agaléga, dropping 147 mm (5.8 in) of rainfall.
- January 20, 1978 – Cyclone Fleur passed just east of Mauritius, producing wind gusts of 145 km/h (90 mph), which damaged crops. Heavy rainfall occurred on neighboring Réunion, reaching 442 mm (17.4 in) at Foc Foc.
- January 29, 1978 – Tropical Storm Huberte brushed Rodrigues with gusty winds.
- March 7, 1978 – Tropical Storm Kiki reformed near Mauritius and latter passed just southeast of Réunion. On the latter island, rainfall reached 275.5 mm (10.85 in), which flooded coastal roads, damaged bridges, and killed two people.
- January 7, 1979 – Cyclone Benjamine passed between Réunion and Mauritius. On the former island, the storm dropped heavy rainfall, reaching 665 mm (26.2 in) at Gite de Bellecombe, along with 126 km/h (78 mph) wind gusts at St. Denis. The storm damaged or destroyed 194 houses, while also damaging crops and power lines.
- February 4, 1979 – Cyclone Celine looped near Mauritius while intensifying, later passing just north of Rodrigues. Wind gusts on the latter island reached 216 km/h (134 mph). The storm killed about half of the population of the critically endangered Rodrigues flying fox.
- February 15, 1979 – For several days, tropical storms Estelle and Fatou moved around the Mascarene Islands, which produced heavy rainfall on Réunion that reached 544 mm (21.4 in) at Petite Plaine.
- December 22, 1979 – After passing southeast of St. Brandon, Cyclone Claudette struck Mauritius, producing wind gusts of 221 km/h (137 mph). The storm caused 5 fatalities, 257 injuries, and US$175 million in damage on the island. About 5,000 houses were destroyed or severely damaged. Effects on neighboring Réunion were limited to 79 km/h (49 mph) wind gusts and some rainfall.

=== 1980s ===
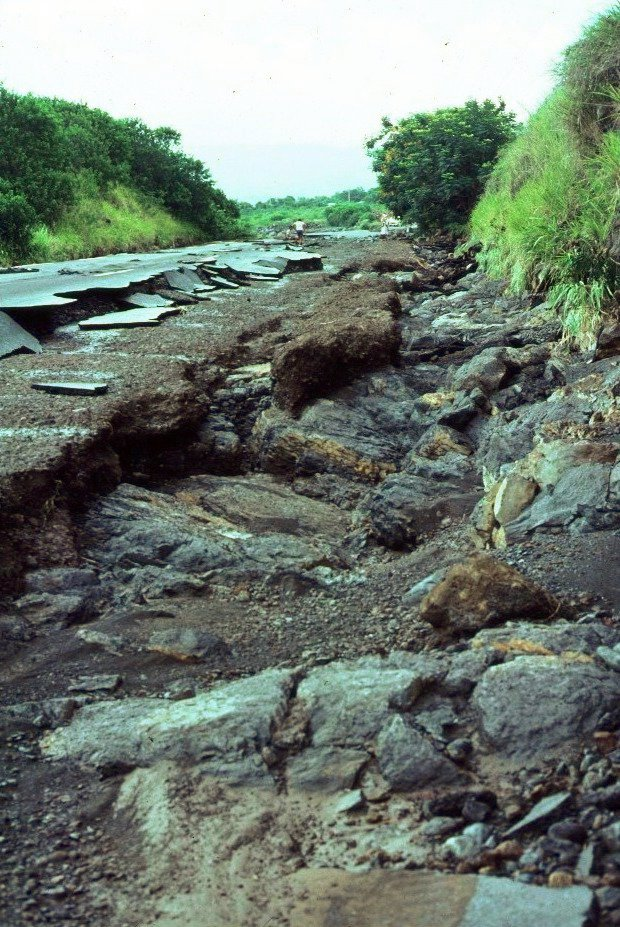
Washed out road in Saint-Pierre, Réunion from Cyclone Hyacinthe

- January 15, 1980 – Cyclone Hyacinthe formed north of Mauritius, and for two weeks moved slowly to the west of the Mascarene Islands. The cyclone produced record rainfall that caused $167 million (676 million francs) in damage and killed 25 people. Over 14 days, Hyacinthe dropped 6,083 mm (239.5 in) of rainfall at Commerson Crater in the mountainous peaks of Réunion, making the storm the wettest tropical cyclone on record. The highest daily total was on January 25, when 1,140 mm (45 in) fell at Commerson. Over a three-day period, the storm dropped 3,240 mm (128 in) at Commerson, as well as 4,300 mm (170 in) over a five-day period ending on January 28. The rains caused flooding and hundreds of mudslides. About half of the roads on the island were damaged, with road damage estimated at $40 million (1980 USD, 161.3 million francs).
- February 3, 1980 – Cyclone Jacinthe passed between Mauritius and Rodrigues, producing wind gusts of 117 and 119 km/h (73 and 74 mph) on the respective islands. Heavy rainfall filled dams to capacity on Rodrigues.
- March 5, 1980 – Cyclone Kolia executed two loops near the Mascarene Islands, bringing the storm between Réunion and Mauritius twice. Wind gusts reached 80 km/h (50 mph) on Mauritius.
- March 13, 1980 – Cyclone Laure passed just east of Mauritius, producing wind gusts of 109 km/h (68 mph) and 65.7 mm (2.59 in) of rainfall.
- January 7, 1981 – The eyewall of Cyclone Florine crossed over Réunion, producing strong wind gusts of 234 km/h (145 mph) at Plaine des Cafres, as well as heavy rainfall reaching 1,161 mm (45.7 in) at Foc-Foc. The storm damaged crops, power lines, and houses, leaving 500 people homeless. Cilaos and Salazie became isolated during the storm. Two people were injured on the island. Winds on Mauritius reached 137 km/h (85 mph).
- January 31, 1981 – Tropical Depression Helyette passed south of Rodrigues, and the next day moved over Mauritius and just southeast of Réunion. The highest wind gust was 121 km/h (75 mph) at Fort William on Mauritius.
- March 6, 1981 – Strengthening Tropical Storm Johanne passed between Réunion and Mauritius while passing southeastward, with respective island rainfall totals of 316 and 260 mm (12.4 and 10.2 in). The highest wind gust was 124 km/h (77 mph) at Mon Desert Alma on Mauritius.
- April 9, 1981 – Tropical Storm Lisa executed a loop north of the Mascarene Islands, coming within 200 km (120 mi) of Mauritius. For several days, the storm dropped rainfall on the islands, reaching 398 mm (15.7 in) in Mauritius and 445 mm (17.5 in) on Réunion. Flooding caused road damage in the latter island.
- January 17, 1982 – Cyclone Damia passed just north of Rodrigues, producing wind gusts of 113 km/h (70 mph) as well as dropping nearly 300 mm (12 in) of rainfall in 24 hours. The storm damaged crops and houses, with monetary damage estimated around U$650,000.
- February 6, 1982 – Tropical Storm Gabrielle passed northwest of the Mascarene Islands, producing wind gusts of 158 km/h (98 mph) on Réunion at Plaine des Cafres.
- February 20, 1982 – A tropical depression brought several days of rainfall to Mauritius before dissipating.
- December 3, 1982 – Severe Tropical Storm Bemany bypassed St. Brandon, bringing wind gusts of 93 km/h (58 mph), before the storm brushed Mauritius with gusts of 68 km/h (42 mph).
- December 8, 1983 – Cyclone Andry passed just south of Agaléga, producing wind gusts of 174 km/h (108 mph). The storm damaged or destroyed every house on the island, leaving the 350 residents without power, food, water, or shelter. Andry injured 30 people and killed one on the island.
- December 25, 1983 – Tropical Cyclone Bakoly passed between Réunion and Mauritius, producing 197 km/h (122 mph) wind gusts and 507 mm (20.0 in) of rainfall on the latter island. The cyclone caused eight injuries, one of them serious when a damaged house collapsed. Damage on Mauritius was estimated at RS300 million (US$21 million). (Note: Original currency in 1984 Mauritian rupees, converted to United States dollars via FXTOP.com.) Rainfall on Réunion reached 300 mm (12 in).
- January 23, 1984 – Tropical Storm Edoara struck Rodrigues, producing gusts of 131 km/h (81 mph), and heavy rainfall reaching 253 mm (10.0 in) at Baie aux Huîtres.
- February 16, 1984 – Developing Tropical Storm Haja passed just south of Rodrigues, producing wind gusts of less than 70 km/h (43 mph).
- January 16, 1985 – While executing a loop, Tropical Storm Celestina struck Réunion. The storm dropped several days of rainfall, with a peak 24 hour rainfall total of 837 mm (33.0 in) in Aurere.
- February 11, 1985 – For six days, Tropical Storm Gerimena developed and moved around Réunion, with a maximum rainfall of 756 mm (29.8 in).
- April 14, 1985 – Cyclone Helisaonina executed a loop just north of Rodrigues, bringing wind gusts of 117 km/h (73 mph).
- January 14, 1986 – Severe Tropical Storm Costa passed northeast of Rodrigues, where it produced wind gusts of 107 km/h (66 mph).
- February 7, 1986 – Severe Tropical Storm Erinesta bypassed Réunion to the west, bringing several days of heavy rainfall that totaled 1,643 mm (64.7 in) at Cilaos, of which 1,017 mm (40.0 in) fell over 24 hours. The storm caused flooding, but also helped replenish aquifer levels after two years of drought conditions.
- March 12, 1986 – Intensifying Cyclone Honorinina brushed St. Brandon with 100 km/h (62 mph) wind gusts.
- January 4, 1987 – A tropical depression passed just west of Réunion, dropping 600 mm (24 in) of rainfall at Dos d'Âne.
- February 6, 1987 – Developing Tropical Storm Bemazava produced wind gusts of 117 km/h (73 mph) on Rodrigues.
- February 10, 1987 – Tropical Storm Clotilda stalled southwest of Réunion for two days, dropping torrential rainfall which peaked at 2,723 mm (107.2 in) at Bébourg. Clotilda killed 10 people and destroyed over 120 houses, with damage estimated at US$2 million.
- January 2, 1988 – Tropical Depression Benandro produced wind gusts of 69 km/h (43 mph) while passing north of Réunion.
- January 28, 1989 – Cyclone Firinga brushed the northwest coast of Mauritius, causing about $60 million (1989 USD) in damage and one fatality. A day later, Firinga made landfall on Réunion, where the cyclone killed 10 people and caused ₣1 billion (1989 francs, $157 million 1989 USD) in damage. The storm produced wind gusts of 216 km/h (134 mph) at Saint-Pierre. Rainfall on Réunion reached 1,309 mm (51.5 in) at Pas de Bellecombe. The high rainfall caused flooding and landslides, and left 60% of the island without power.
- March 25, 1989 – Developing Tropical Storm Jinabo dropped heavy rainfall on Réunion, reaching 565 mm (22.2 in) at Sainte-Rose.
- April 5, 1989 – Cyclone Krisy passed north of Rodrigues, producing 122 km/h (76 mph) gusts and 97.6 mm (3.84 mm) of rainfall. Later, the storm struck Mauritius, where wind gusts reached 155 km/h (96 mph), compounding on the crop damage caused by Firinga two months prior. A farmer killed himself due to the threat of the storm.

=== 1990s ===
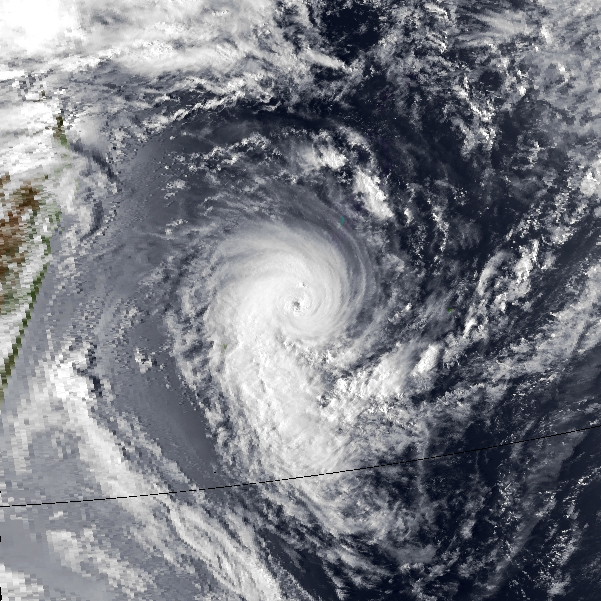
Satellite image of Cyclone Hollanda

- January 31, 1991 – Cyclone Bella passed about 50 km (31 mi) west of Rodrigues, producing wind gusts of 210 km/h (130 mph), which damaged 1,200 homes and destroyed 300 others, leaving about 1,000 people homeless. The cyclone also destroyed over 90% of the crops on the island were destroyed, and killed half of the critically endangered Rodrigues flying fox.
- March 3, 1992 – Tropical Depression Gerda brought wind gusts of 100 km/h (62 mph) to Rodrigues.
- January 19, 1993 – The eyewall of Cyclone Colina struck Réunion, dropping 894 mm (35.2 in) of rainfall over 24 hours, and producing wind gusts of 205 km/h (127 mph) at La Plaine-des-Palmistes. Colina killed two people on the island, and also caused power outages and crop damage.
- January 22, 1993 – High waves caused by a polar trough and Tropical Storm Dessilia affect southwestern Réunion.
- January 27, 1993 – Cyclone Edwina passed between Rodrigues and Mauritius, producing respective peak island wind gusts of 145 and 124 km/h (90 and 77 mph). Rainfall reached 108 mm (4.3 in) on Mauritius.
- February 13, 1993 – Developing Tropical Storm Finella passed southwest of Réunion, dropping 1,074 mm (42.3 in) of rainfall at Saint-Benoît.
- February 27, 1993 – A tropical disturbance, later named Hutelle despite not attaining tropical storm status, dropped torrential rainfall on Réunion, reaching 1 to 2 m (3.3 to 6.6 ft) in some locations.
- December 21, 1993 – Weakening Tropical Storm Cecilia passed north of Mauritius and Réunion, with rainfall on the latter island reaching 475 mm (18.7 in) over 24 hours.
- February 10, 1994 – Cyclone Hollanda struck the north coast of Mauritius, producing wind gusts of 216 km/h (134 mph) in the capital Port Louis. Hollanda killed two people during its passage and left US$135 million in damage (1994 USD); The storm heavily damaged or destroyed 450 houses, leaving 1,500 people homeless. The storm was the most damaging for the island since Cyclone Gervaise in 1975. Hollanda caused the island's gross domestic product to decline by 10%. The cyclone later brushed the coast of Réunion. There, Hollanda produced wind gusts of 234 km/h (145 mph), which caused damage to crops and power lines. Rainfall on Réunion reached 741 mm (29.2 in).
- February 16, 1994 – Cyclone Ivy approached within 100 km (62 mi) west of Rodrigues, bringing gusts of 130 km/h (81 mph).
- March 10, 1994 – Tropical Storm Kelvina dropped heavy rainfall on Réunion while passing west of the island, reaching 811 mm (31.9 in).
- March 13, 1994 – High waves from Cyclone Litanne affected the northern coast of Réunion and Mauritius.
- April 12, 1994 – Cyclone Odille passed of Rodrigues, producing wind gusts of 125 km/h (78 mph).
- November 30, 1994 – Tropical Storm Albertine passed south of Rodrigues, producing heavy rainfall and wind gusts to 170 km/h (110 mph).
- January 6, 1995 – Developing Tropical Storm Christelle absorbed Tropical Storm Bentha near the Mascarene Islands. For five days, the two storms brought rainfall to Mauritius and Réunion.
- January 27, 1995 – Cyclone Dorina passed south of Rodrigues, bringing gusts of 115 km/h (71 mph).
- February 8, 1995 – Cyclone Gail skirted by Rodrigues, producing wind gusts of 193 km/h (120 mph).
- February 26, 1995 – Cyclone Ingrid passed between Mauritius and Rodrigues, producing wind gusts of 91 km/h (57 mph) at the former island.
- March 13, 1995 – Tropical Storm Kylie struck Réunion, producing winds of 100 km/h (65 km/h).
- March 16, 1995 – Tropical Depression Lidy stalled near Rodrigues, dropping 200 mm (7.9 in) of rainfall and causing flooding damage.
- December 30, 1995 – Tropical Depression B2 dropped 350 mm (14 in) of rainfall on Réunion while passing to the west of the island.
- February 25, 1996 – Cyclone Edwige produced 150 km/h (93 mph) while passing north of Réunion.
- February 29, 1996 – Cyclone Flossy passed about 80 km (50 mi) northwest of Rodrigues, producing wind gusts of 160 km/h (99 mph).
- March 22, 1996 – Tropical Storm Guylianne passed about 50 km (31 mi) east of Mauritius, bringing beneficial rainfall.
- April 6, 1996 – Cyclone Hansella moved over Rodrigues, dropping a month's worth of rainfall – 182 mm (7.2 in) – in a 24-hour period. The storm later dropped rainfall in Réunion.
- December 8, 1996 – Tropical Storm Daniella crossed between Mauritius and Réunion, producing wind gusts of 154 km/h (96 mph) and about 300 mm (12 in) of rainfall on Mauritius. About half of the island lost power, and there were three storm related deaths.
- January 22, 1997 – Cyclone Gretelle passed northwest of Réunion, dropping heavy rainfall in the mountainous peaks of the island; Mafate recorded over 600 mm (24 in) of precipitation.
- February 21, 1997 – Tropical Storm Karlette passed south of Rodrigues, dropping 100 mm (3.9 in) of rainfall on the island.
- February 10, 1998 – Cyclone Anacelle passed west of St. Brandon, and a day later west of Mauritius, producing gusty winds and rainfall on both islands.
- February 24, 1998 – Tropical Depression D2 dropped heavy rainfall while in the vicinity of Réunion and Mauritius, reaching nearly 700 mm (28 in) over a 24-hour period at Salazie, Réunion. The rains caused flooding, landslides, and power outages.
- February 3, 1999 – Tropical Storm Chikita passed north of Rodrigues, Mauritius, and Réunion, providing beneficial rainfall. The highest rainfall was 953 mm (37.5 in) in Bébourg, Réunion.
- March 9, 1999 – The eyewall of Cyclone Davina crossed over Mauritius, a day after passing north of Rodrigues and a day prior to passing west of Réunion. Rainfall on Réunion reached 1,200 mm (47 in) in the island's center. Two people drowned in the Rivière des Galets, but otherwise the rainfall proved beneficial in alleviating dry conditions.

=== 2000s ===
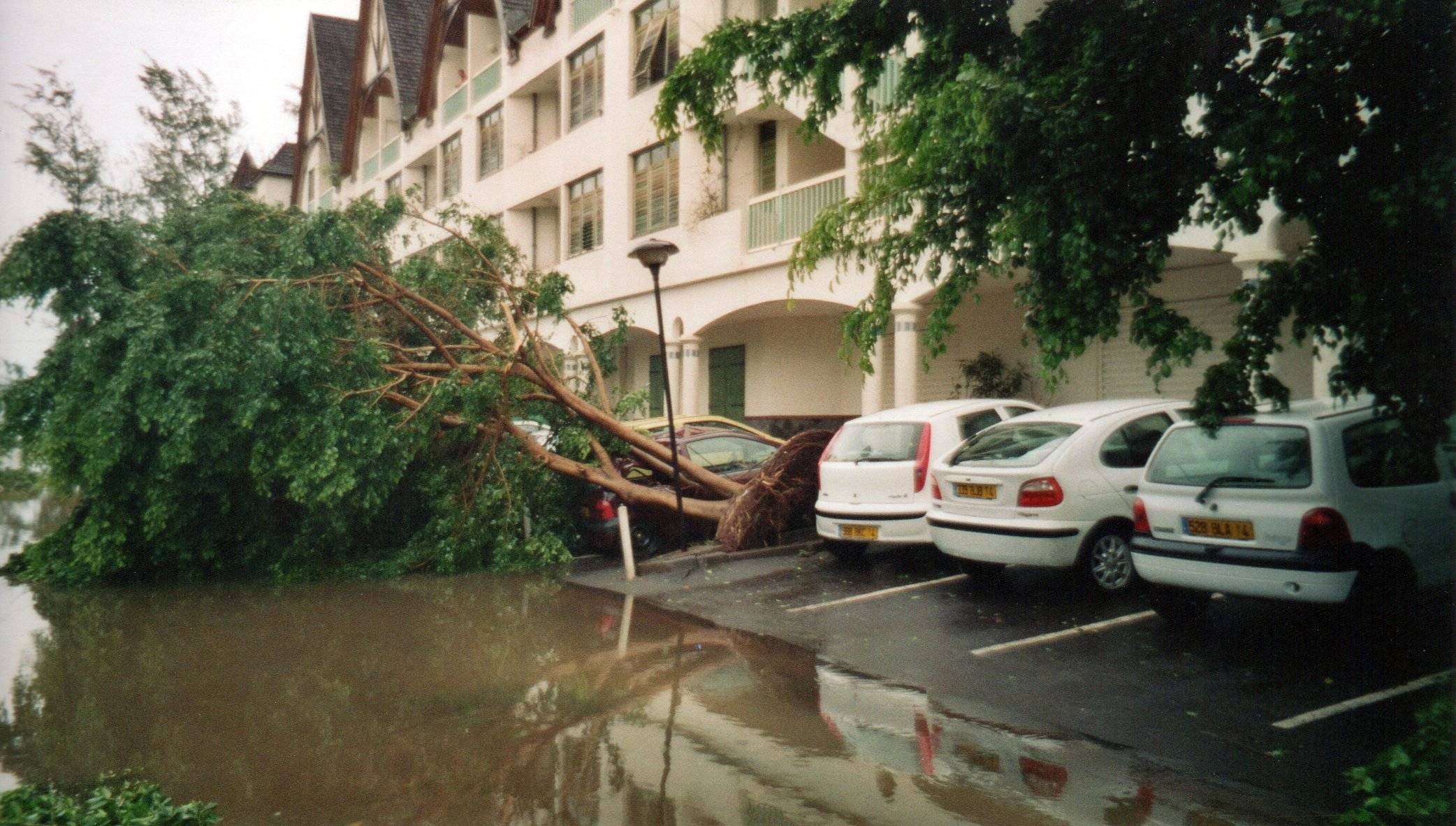
Flooding on Réunion from Cyclone Dina

- January 29, 2000 – Cyclone Connie passed north of Mauritius and Réunion as a weakening storm, bringing heavy rainfall to both islands. At Commerson Crater on Réunion, rainfall reached 1,752 mm (69.0 in). One man died on Mauritius during the storm while attempting to secure his house, and two died on Réunion.
- February 14, 2000 – Cyclone Eline passed north of Mauritius and Réunion, dropping 1,500 mm (59 in) of rainfall at Bébourg, Réunion.
- February 27, 2000 – The tropical disturbance that later became Tropical Storm Gloria produced gale-force winds on Tromelin and St. Brandon.
- April 1, 2000 – Cyclone Hudah produced gusts of 180 km/h (110 mph) on Tromelin Island, days after producing gusty winds on Rodrigues and St. Brandon.
- January 6, 2001 – While passing west of Réunion, Cyclone Ando dropped heavy rainfall reaching 1,255 mm (49.4 in) at Pas de Bellecombe. The rains caused landslides and flooding that killed two people.
- January 22, 2001 – A tropical depression dropped about 100 mm (3.9 in) of rainfall while in the vicinity of Réunion.
- January 25, 2001 – former Cyclone Charly dropped rainfall on Mauritius and Réunion as a weak disturbance drifting to the south of the islands.
- April 6, 2001 – Severe Tropical Storm Evariste passed east of St. Brandon, and a day later to the southwest of Rodrigues, producing rainfall and gusty winds.
- January 20, 2002 – Cyclone Dina passed north of Rodrigues, where rough waves killed five fishermen. Over the next two days, Dina moved north of Mauritius, where damage totaled $50 million, largely from agriculture losses. Four people died on the island. Dina also passed near Réunion, producing 277 km/h (172 mph) wind gusts at Maïdo, the highest on record for the island. In the mountainous peaks of Réunion, rainfall reached 2,102 mm (82.8 in) in La Plaine des Chicots. The rains caused flooding that contributed to six deaths and left €95 million (US$83.4 million) in damage. The Ravine des Cabris reached an all-time record flood while three other rivers reached their second-highest levels, only behind flooding from Cyclone Firinga in 1989.
- February 19, 2002 – Cyclone Guillaume passed about 150 km (93 mi) east of Mauritius, producing light winds and rainfall.
- March 12, 2002 – Cyclone Hary passed about 350 km (220 mi) west of Réunion. It dropped 1,344 mm (52.9 in) of rainfall in Bébourg, which caused river flooding that killed one person. Light rainfall occurred in neighboring Mauritius.
- November 19, 2002 – Cyclone Boura passed north of St. Brandon, Mauritius, and Réunion, producing wind gusts of 118 km/h (73 mph) on Mauritius.
- December 27, 2002 – Cyclone Crystal dropped light rainfall on Mauritius while passing to the east of the island.
- February 13, 2003 – As part of an outbreak of four storms across the Indian Ocean, Cyclone Gerry produced high waves, gusty winds, and rainfall on Mauritius, killing one person due to electrocution.
- March 12, 2003 – Cyclone Kalunde approached within 55 km (34 mi) of Rodrigues to the east, leaving the island without power, and causing €3.4 million (US$3.15 million) in damage.
- May 5, 2003 – Cyclone Manou passed north of Mauritius, producing wind gusts of 107 km/h (66 mph).
- November 25, 2003 – Cyclone Beni dissipated north of the archipelago, bringing rainfall to Réunion.
- January 2, 2004 – Severe Tropical Storm Darius passed just 15 km (9.3 mi) east of Mahébourg, Mauritius. Heavy rainfall – peaking at 271 mm (10.7 in) – helped end drought conditions on the island.
- February 1, 2004 – The interaction of cyclones Elita and Frank produced high waves on the western shores of Mauritius and Réunion.
- March 5, 2004 – While intensifying into the most intense tropical cyclone in the basin, Cyclone Gafilo dropped 393 mm (15.5 in) of rainfall on Réunion, well to the south of the storm's center.
- May 16, 2004 – former Tropical Storm Juba passed just west of Rodrigues, dropping beneficial rainfall to an area facing drought conditions.
- February 2, 2005 – The monsoonal depression that later became Tropical Storm Gerard passed over Rodrigues.
- March 24, 2005 – Severe Tropical Storm Hennie passed about 140 km (87 mi) east of Mauritius. The storm dropped heavy rainfall in the Mascarene Islands, including a 24-hour precipitation total of 397 mm (15.6 in) in the mountainous peaks of Réunion.
- April 10, 2005 – Cyclone Juliet approached within 215 km (134 mi) east of Rodrigues, and its strong winds heavily damaged 15 corn plantations on the island.
- January 24, 2006 – Developing Tropical Storm Boloetse dropped rainfall on the Mascarene Islands while passing west of the islands. On Mauritius, Vacoas recorded 175 mm (6.9 in) of rainfall over 24 hours.
- February 15, 2006 – A developing tropical storm dropped 1-in-50 year rainfall rates on Réunion. A station in the capital Saint-Denis recorded 376 mm (14.8 in) in just three hours, and over 48 hours, Le Brûlé recorded 1,274 mm (50.2 in) of precipitation.
- March 4, 2006 – Tropical Storm Diwa passed northwest of Réunion, dropping torrential rainfall in the island's mountainous center. Grand-Îlet recorded 2,943 mm (115.9 in) over four days. Diwa contributed to 10 deaths on Réunion – four due to road accidents, three from using generators inside their homes, two due to a landslide, and one related to flooding.
- January 1, 2007 – High waves from Tropical Storm Clovis affected the north coast of Mauritius.
- February 6, 2007 – Tropical Storm Dora passed about 165 km (103 mi) east of Rodrigues, dropping 92 mm (3.6 in) of rainfall.
- February 9, 2007 – Severe Tropical Storm Enok brushed St. Brandon with gusts of 160 km/h (99 mph) and 118 mm (4.6 in) of rainfall. A day later, the storm approached within 25 km (16 mi) east of Rodrigues, producing gusts of 142 km/h (88 mph) and dropping 147.5 mm (5.81 in) of rainfall.
- February 15, 2007 – Cyclone Favio passed about 120 km (75 mi) north-northwest of Rodrigues, resulting in beneficial rainfall. Port Sud Est recorded 217.6 mm (8.57 in) of rainfall, and wind gusts reached 114 km/h (71 mph).

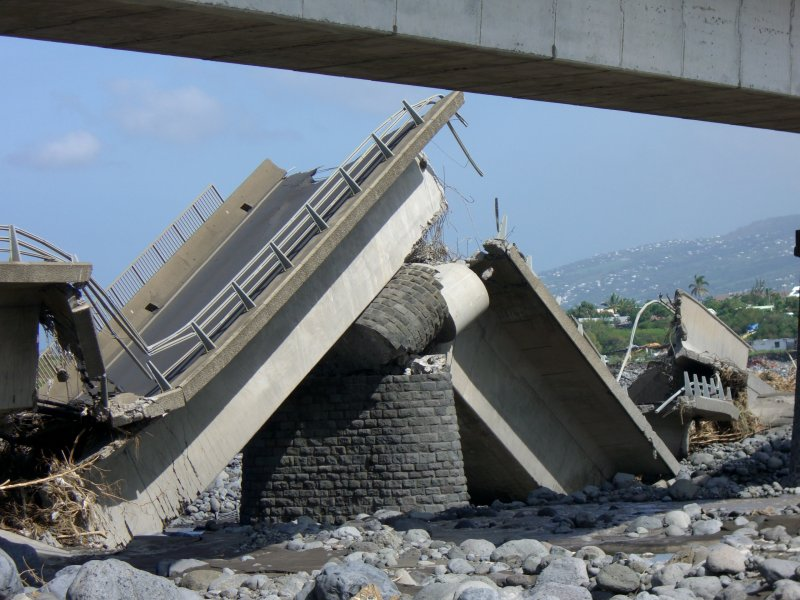
Bridge on Réunion damaged by Cyclone Gamede

- February 23, 2007 – Cyclone Gamede began dropping rainfall on Réunion, and for the next several days the storm meandered to the northwest of the island. Over a four-day period from February 24–28, Commerson Crater in Réunion's mountainous interior recorded 4,869 mm (191.7 in) of rainfall, breaking the world record for the most precipitation recorded over 72 hours and 96 hours, set previously during Cyclone Hyacinthe in 1980. Over a nine-day period, the same station recorded 5,512 mm (217.0 in). The rains caused flooding that washed out a bridge near Saint-Louis, with the cost estimated at €20 million (2007 EUR, $26 million 2007 USD). Two people died on Réunion while attempting to cross flooded roads. The storm also dropped amounts of rainfall on St. Brandon and Mauritius. Gamede caused two fatalities and left 70% of Mauritius without power.
- March 8, 2007 – Developing Cyclone Indlala passed just north of St. Brandon, where 25 mm (0.98 in) of rainfall was recorded.
- April 1, 2007 – Cyclone Jaya passed north of St. Brandon, where 11.7 mm (0.46 in) of rainfall was reported.
- December 17, 2007 – Tropical Storm Celina's passage south of Rodrigues resulted in boating damage and beneficial rainfall, peaking at 120 mm (4.7 in). Celina's rainfall contributed to a traffic fatality on Réunion, where precipitation reached 374 mm (14.7 in) in Plaine des Chicots.
- January 8, 2008 – A tropical disturbance dropped heavy rainfall on Mauritius.
- February 1, 2008 – Tropical Storm Fame stalls southwest of Réunion, producing high waves and wind gusts of 112 km/h (70 mph) on the island.
- February 23, 2008 – former Cyclone Hondo traversed Réunion as a tropical disturbance, 16 days after Hondo became an intense tropical cyclone. Heavy rainfall associated with the storm reached 507 mm (20.0 in) in the volcanic peak of the island.
- March 22, 2008 – Tropical Storm Lola weakened to a tropical depression while stalling north of Mauritius. The storm dropped heavy rainfall on the island, which contributed to four deaths.
- February 4, 2009 – Intensifying Cyclone Gael passed north of Rodrigues and south of St. Brandon; a station in the latter island recorded 266 mm (10.5 in) of rainfall. An intense rainband struck Réunion while Gael traversed the waters between the island and Madagascar, with the highest wind gust – 144 km/h (89 mph) – and rainfall – 901 mm (35.5 in) recorded in the volcanic peak. The cyclone caused two fatalities on Réunion.
- April 6, 2009 – Severe Tropical Storm Jade struck northeastern Madagascar, but its outer rainbands dropped rainfall on Réunion on two separate occasions, reaching 637 mm (25.1 in). Flooding left over €15 million (U$20 million) in damage.
- December 28, 2009 – The dissipating remnants of Tropical Storm David brought over 250 mm (9.8 in) of rainfall to La Fournaise, Réunion.

=== 2010s ===
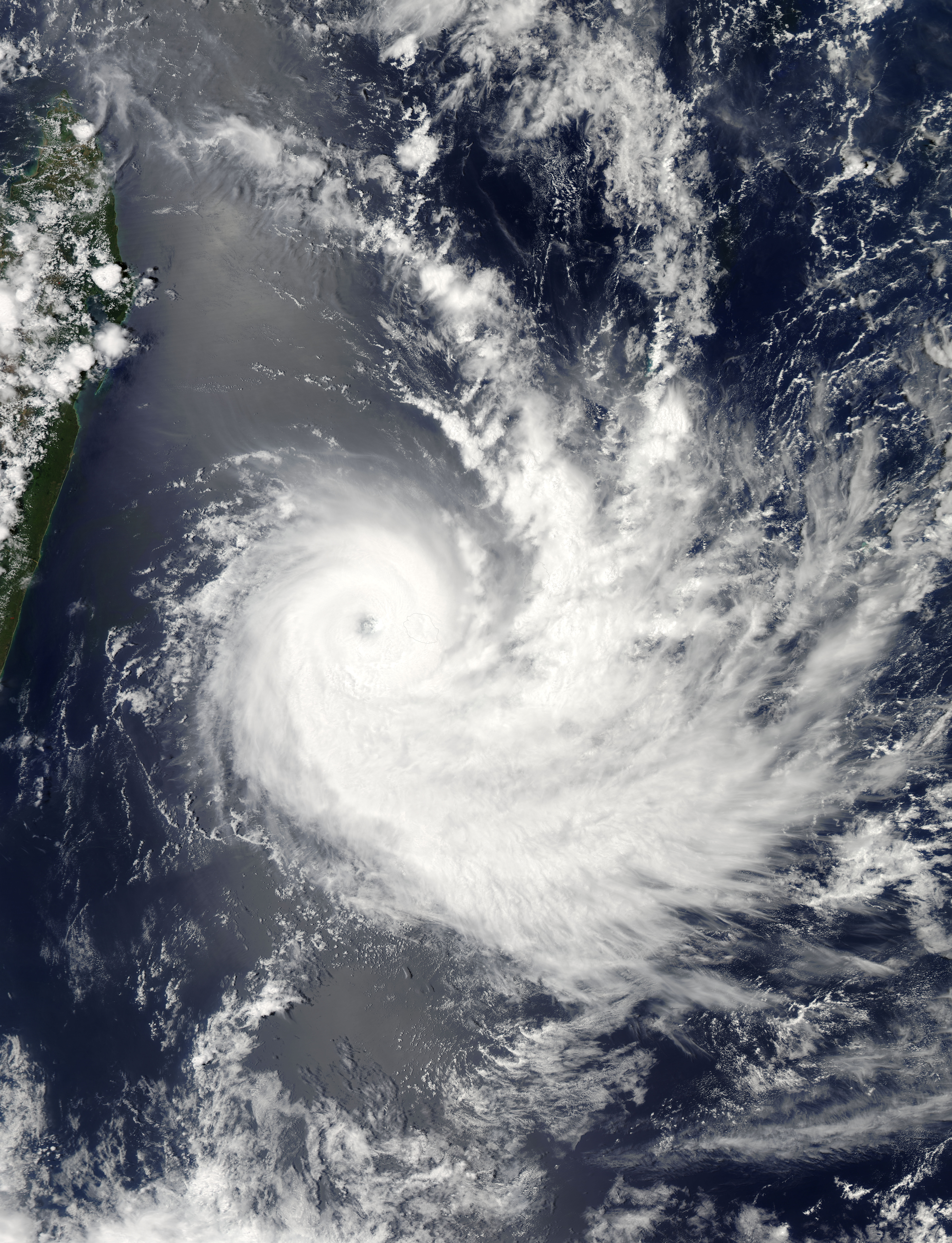
Cyclone Bejisa striking Réunion on January 2, 2014

- February 20, 2010 – Weakening Cyclone Gelane moved between Mauritius and Rodrigues, dropping 143 mm (5.6 in) of rainfall on the latter island.
- March 7, 2010 – The formative stages of Tropical Storm Hubert produced an area of thunderstorms from Réunion to Madagascar.
- March 19, 2011 – Tropical Storm Cherono passed just south of Rodrigues, producing gusty winds.
- January 21, 2012 – A teenager was electrocuted during the passage of Tropical Storm Ethel.
- February 11, 2012 – The passage of Cyclone Giovanna to the north caused the airport and port to be closed in Mauritius. The cyclone killed one person each on Réunion and Mauritius.
- February 21, 2012 – The approach of Tropical Storm Hilwa brought gusty winds to Rodrigues.
- January 3, 2013 – Tropical Cyclone Dumile passed west of Réunion, producing wind gusts of 180 km/h (110 mph). The winds caused power outages that killed one person. Agricultural damage totaled €31 million (US$41.3 million).
- January 31, 2013 – High winds and rainfall from Cyclone Felleng left 11,200 homes without power on Réunion.
- April 15, 2013 – For several days, Cyclone Imelda approached Rodrigues, dropping 182 mm (7.2 in) of rainfall.
- December 21, 2013 – Cyclone Amara made its closest approach to Rodrigues, producing 152 km/h (94 mph) winds. About 80% of the island lost power.
- January 2, 2014 – Cyclone Bejisa passed just west of Réunion, dropping 800 mm (31 in) of rainfall at Cilaos. The heavy rains left €63 million (US$85.2 million) in agriculture damage on the island. One person died from head trauma while 16 people were injured in various incidents.
- February 6, 2014 – Tropical Storm Edilson passed just east of Mauritius, dropping 97 mm (3.8 in) of rainfall.
- January 14, 2015 – Intensifying Cyclone Bansi produced 167 km/h (104 mph) wind gusts and flooded the entirety of Île Raphael in St. Brandon. The cyclone also affected Mauritius and Rodrigues, dropping 315 mm (12.4 in) of rainfall in the latter island.
- January 17, 2015 – Tropical Storm Chedza emerged from Madagascar into the Indian Ocean, bringing a plume of moisture over Réunion that reached 270 mm (11 in) in Salazie.
- March 9, 2015 – Tropical Storm Haliba dropped heavy rainfall on Réunion, with 181 mm (7.1 in) recorded in one hour, and a total of 520 mm (20 in) recorded over four days. The rains closed roads on the island and caused mudslides on nearby Mauritius.
- February 10, 2016 – Tropical Storm Daya intensified while moving away from Réunion and Mauritius, bringing over 100 mm (3.9 in) of rainfall to both islands, which damaged homes on Mauritius.
- February 8, 2017 – Tropical Storm Carlos passed west of the archipelago, leaving 4,000 people without power on Réunion, and causing flooding on Mauritius.
- January 18, 2018 – While passing southeast of Mauritius and Réunion, Cyclone Berguitta caused flooding and produced 120 km/h (75 mph) winds, which knocked down trees and left over 72,000 people without power.
- March 5, 2018 – Cyclone Dumazile passed between Réunion and Madagascar, producing flooding rainfall and gusty winds on the former island.
- March 18, 2018 – High waves from Tropical Storm Eliakim affected coastal roads in Réunion, and wind gusts reached 151 km/h (94 mph) on the island.
- April 24, 2018 – Cyclone Fakir passed just east of Réunion, causing €15 million (US$17 million) in damage and killing two people due to a landslide. A late-season storm, Fakir dropped 415 mm (16.3 in) of rainfall in a 24-hour period, as well as producing 176 km/h (109 mph) wind gusts. The heavy rainfall caused flooding and landslides.
- December 23, 2018 – Cyclone Cilida passed east of Mauritius, bringing beneficial rainfall as well as gusty winds that knocked down tree branches.
- February 7, 2019 – The threat from Cyclone Funani prompted officials to cancel flights on Rodrigues.
- February 10, 2019 – Cyclone Gelena passed just southwest of Rodrigues, producing strong winds that left 90% of the island without power.
- March 27, 2019 – The eye of Cyclone Joaninha approached within 80 km (50 mi) of Rodrigues, producing wind gusts of 161 km/h (100 mph) and nearly 200 mm (7.9 in) of precipitation. Joaninha damaged more than 100 houses and caused widespread power outages.
- December 31, 2019 - The eye of Cyclone Calvina approached within 60 km (37 mi) of Mauritius with maximum wind gusts of 122 km/h (75mph).

=== 2020s ===
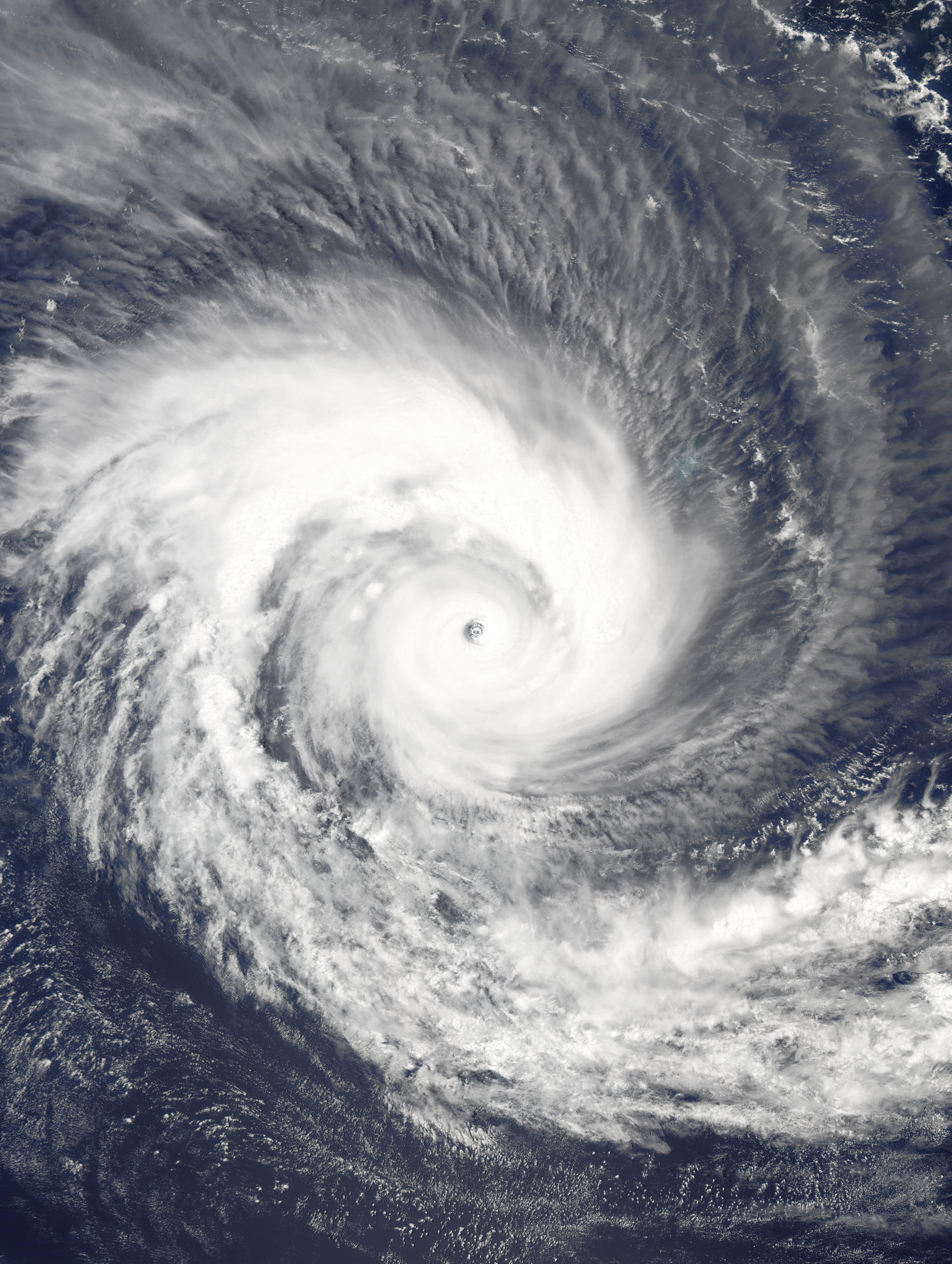
Satellite image of Cyclone Batsirai passing near Mauritius in February 2, 2022

- 24 January, 2020 - Tropical Storm Diane passed near Mauritius.
- 16-18 March, 2020 - Cyclone Herold passed near Mauritius in 16 March and Rodrigues in 18 March causing minimal damage.
- 12 January, 2021 - the remnants of Tropical Storm Danilo passed over Mauritius.
- 6 March, 2021 - Tropical Storm Iman passed south of Réunion as a Tropical Depression.
- 2 February, 2022 - Cyclone Batsirai passed north of Mauritius, killing two people there with strong winds as well as affecting Réunion.
- 20 February, 2022 - Cyclone Emnati passed over the Mascarene Islands with a similar track to Batsirai while being further North and less intense than Batsirai.
- 21 February, 2023 - Cyclone Freddy passed over the Mascarenes, sinking a Taiwanese boat with a crew of 16 people in Mauritius, and killing one person in Mauritius.

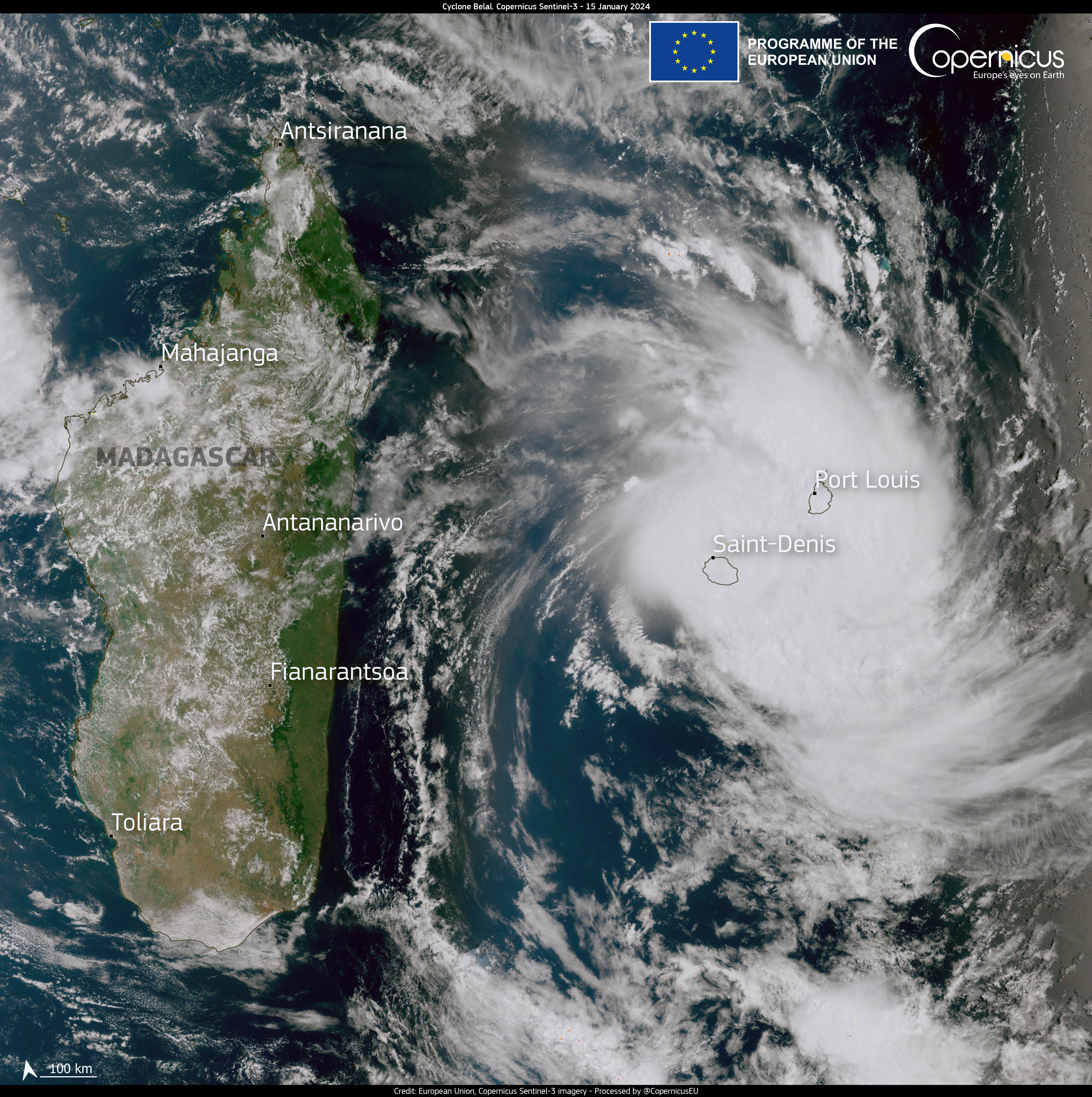
Cyclone Belal passing over Réunion on January 15, 2024.

- 15 January, 2024 - Cyclone Belal's eye passed Northeast over Réunion killing 4 people there and flooding the main capital of Mauritius, Port-Louis, killing 2 people there, the Cyclone warning in Mauritius was Class II, meaning people were at work except for school and people ended up getting their cars destroyed by the floods in Port-Louis.
- 24 January, 2024 - Tropical Storm Candice made landfall in Mauritius as a Tropical Depression before heading south and intensifying into a Tropical Storm in 25 January and dissipating in 29 January.
- 22 February, 2024 - Tropical Storm Eleanor passed 85 km (53 mi) east of Mauritius leaving 10 000 customers without electricity.
- 20 November, 2024 - Cyclone Bheki passed 40 km (25 mi) North of Rodrigues as a Moderate Tropical Storm, leaving 64% of the population of Rodrigues without electricity and passing 50 km (31 mi) of Mauritius.
- 11 December 2024 - Cyclone Chido made landfall on Agaléga as a category 4 equivalent tropical cyclone on the Saffir-Simpson scale destroying 95% of the island's infrastructure and reportedly devastating it.
- 2 February, 2025 - Tropical Depression Faida passed near Mauritius as a Tropical Depression causing no significant damage.
- 28 February, 2025 - Cyclone Garance made landfall in Réunion Island causing significant damage, extreme flooding and killing 4 people, A class III warning was issued in Mauritius, however, damage in Mauritius was minimal.

== Climatological statistics ==
Storms affecting the Mascarene Islands by month
Month	Number of storms
January	84
February	102
March	62
April	27
May	3
September	1
October	1
November	6
December	29

Storms affecting the Mascarene Islands by period
Period	Number of storms
1600s	2
1700s	8
1800s	5
1900–49	8
1950s	2
1960s	43
1970s	41
1980s	29
1990s	34
2000s	42
2010s	25
2020s	14

== See also ==
- Tropical cyclones in the Comoros Islands
- Tropical cyclones in Southern Africa
- South-West Indian Ocean tropical cyclone
