= Tropical Storm Clotilda =

Indian ocean tropical storm in 1987

Tropical Cyclone Clotilda
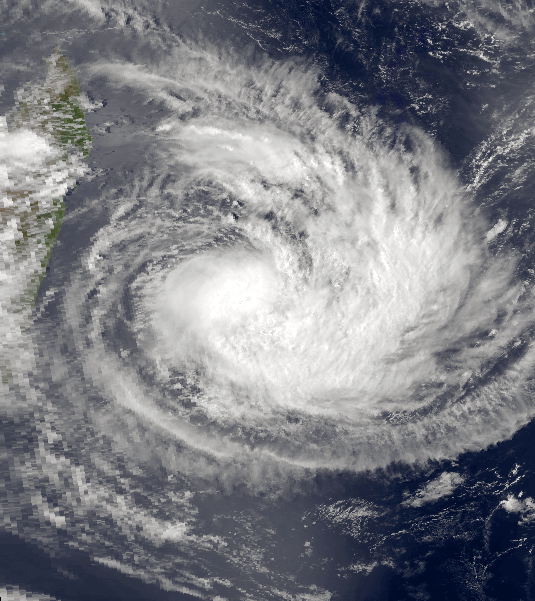
- Tropical Cyclone Clotilda on February 13

Meteorological history
- Formed: February 9, 1987
- Dissipated: February 22, 1987

Severe tropical storm
- 10-minute sustained (MFR)
- Highest winds: 110 km/h (70 mph)
- Lowest pressure: 970 hPa (mbar); 28.64 inHg

Tropical storm
- 1-minute sustained (SSHWS/JTWC)
- Highest winds: 85 km/h (50 mph)

Overall effects
- Fatalities: 10 confirmed
- Damage: $2 million (1987 USD)
- Areas affected: Réunion, Mauritius
- IBTrACS
- Part of the 1986–87 South-West Indian Ocean cyclone season

Tropical Storm Clotilda was a destructive tropical cyclone that inundated Réunion in February 1987. A tropical disturbance first formed between Madagascar and Réunion on February 9 and slowly intensified thereafter. While meandering, the storm fluctuated in intensity before it reached its peak intensity on February 13, with winds of 110 km/h (70 mph). After passing near Réunion, it began to weaken. On February 16, however, Clotilda began to regain strength, and reached its secondary peak on February 17. Two days later, Clotilda became an extratropical cyclone. By February 22, Clotilda was no long being tracked by meteorologists. While active, it brought torrential rains to the island of Réunion during a span of 72 hours. A total of 1,855 mm (73.0 in) of rain was recorded in La Plaine-des-Palmistes; rainfall totals occasionally exceeded the totals measured during Cyclone Hyacinthe, the last major storm to affect Réunion. However, the peak total measured in Hyacinthe was lower than the total measured during Clotilda. Furthermore, about 250 homes were damaged and roughly 120 homes were destroyed. Eighty-nine trees were also brought down during the storm. Throughout the island, damage totaled $2 million (1987 USD) and 10 people were killed. In addition to the destruction on Réunion, 5% of crops on Mauritius were impacted by the storm. During the aftermath of the cyclone, 1,000 people on Réunion were evacuated to shelters.

== Meteorological history ==
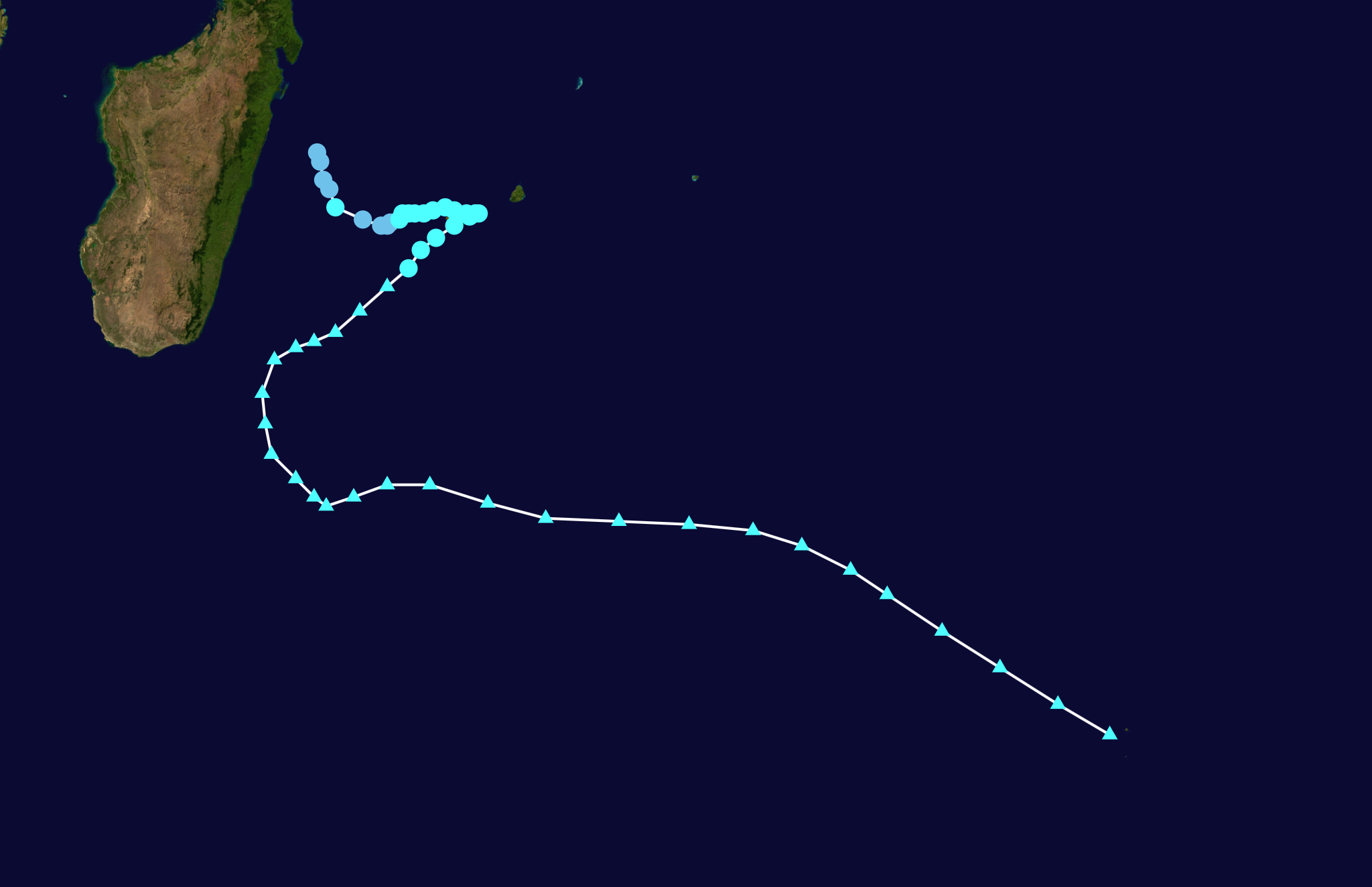
Map plotting the storm's track and intensity, according to the Saffir–Simpson scale Map key Saffir–Simpson scale Tropical depression (≤38 mph, ≤62 km/h) Tropical storm (39–73 mph, 63–118 km/h) Category 1 (74–95 mph, 119–153 km/h) Category 2 (96–110 mph, 154–177 km/h) Category 3 (111–129 mph, 178–208 km/h) Category 4 (130–156 mph, 209–251 km/h) Category 5 (≥157 mph, ≥252 km/h) Unknown Storm type Tropical cyclone Subtropical cyclone Extratropical cyclone, remnant low, tropical disturbance, or monsoon depression

The tropical disturbance that would later become Clotilda was first warned on by Météo-France's (MFR) meteorological office at Réunion at 0600 UTC on February 9. At this time, it was located about 500 km (310 mi) from Réunion. Initially moving south, the storm maintained its intensity for 24 hours before it was upgraded into a moderate tropical storm, (Note: Wind estimates from Météo-France and most other basins throughout the world are sustained over 10 minutes, while estimates from the United States-based Joint Typhoon Warning Center are sustained over 1 minute. 10 minute winds are about 1.14 times the amount of 1 minute winds.) with winds of 65 km/h (40 mph). However, the strengthening trend was short lived, and several hours later, MFR downgraded Clotilda into a tropical depression as it began to meander. At 0600 UTC on February 11, the Joint Typhoon Warning Center (JTWC) issued its first warning on the system. That day, Clotilda began to re-intensify and MFR upgraded Clotilda into a moderate tropical storm for the second time. At 1200 UTC that day, the JTWC reported that Clotilda developed gale-force winds. Data from both agencies suggest that the storm held on to its intensity for about a day before gradually intensifying while turning east, passing within 80 km (50 mi) Réunion. At 1800 UTC on February 12, the JTWC reported that Clotilda had reached its peak intensity of 85 km/h (55 mph) while MFR upgraded Clotilda into a severe tropical storm. The following day, MFR noted that Severe Tropical Storm Clotilda had reached its peak 10-minute sustained wind speed of 110 km/h (70 mph) while undergoing a small clockwise loop, passing about 155 km (95 mi) east of Mauritius.

After peaking in intensity, Severe Tropical Storm Clotilda began to weaken; by February 13, the JTWC had reassessed the intensity of the system to 70 km/h (45 mph). Moreover, MFR reduced to intensity of Clotilda to 155 km/h (95 mph) the next day. Now moving west and away from the island of Reunion, the storm continued to deteriorate, and early on February 15, the JTWC downgraded the system into a tropical depression while centered 560 km (350 mi) west-southwest of Mauritius. Very early on February 16, the JTWC dropped advisories on the system even though MFR was still reporting winds of 65 km/h (40 mph). Thereafter, Clotilda turned west and began to reintensify. Late on February 17, the cyclone reached its secondary peak of 95 km/h (60 mph) while located 1,210 km (750 mi) south-southeast of Réunion. Accelerating, the storm transitioned into an extratropical cyclone on February 19 while turning south and later southeast. At 0000 UTC on February 22, MFR at last stopped monitoring the system.

== Impact and aftermath ==
Clotilda affected Mauritius on February 13 and 14, with winds of up to 145 km/h (90 mph), heavy rain and high seas. This resulted in several homes being flooded and about 5% of the island's sugar crop being damaged.

Due to the storm's slow motion, Cyclone Clotilda brought torrential rains to the island of Réunion during a span of three days. 1,855 mm (75 in) of rain was recorded in La Plaine-des-Palmistes, compared to the 1,716 mm (67.6 in) of rain measured at that same location during Cyclone Hyacinthe, the last major storm to affect the region. However, this total was significantly less than the peak total of 6,083 mm (239.5 in) recorded at Commerson during Hyacinthe. Throughout the island, rainfall totals usually exceeded the totals measured during Hyacinthe. Major flooding was reported, damaging many roads, and 89 trees fell during the storm. A total 250 dwellings were damaged and nearly 120 others were completely destroyed, with several completely destroyed. This left around 4,000 people homeless. The north side of the island as well as the capital city of Saint Denis took the brunt of the cyclone; wind gusts of 170 km/h (105 mph) were measured there. In all, damage from the storm totaled $2 million (1987 USD). A total of 40,000 people were affected by the storm. Clotilda killed 10 people on the island.

Following the storm on Réunion, "tens of millions of francs" were needed to repair damaged roads. Furthermore, 1,000 people moved to emergency shelters. On February 18, 250,000 Euros were granted to nation to cope with the aftermath of Clotilda. According to one account, it took five days for most food items to be restored to the island.

== See also ==
- Tropical cyclones in the Mascarene Islands
- Cyclone Hyacinthe
- Cyclone Dina
