= 1892 Mauritius cyclone =

Fourth-deadliest tropical cyclone recorded in the Southern Hemisphere

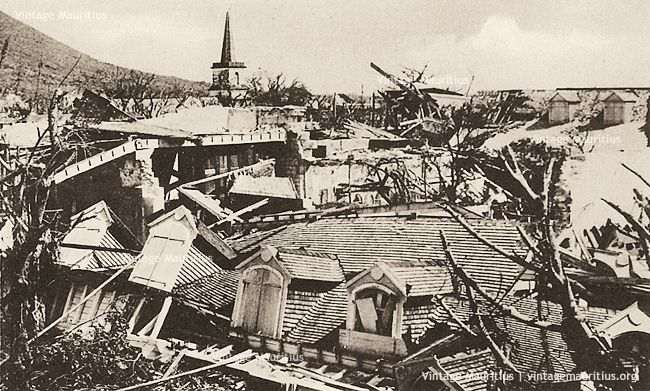
- Damage in Port Louis from the storm

Meteorological history
- Formed: April 1892
- Dissipated: After 29 April 1892

Category 3-equivalent tropical cyclone
- 1-minute sustained (SSHWS)
- Highest winds: 195 km/h (120 mph)
- Highest gusts: 215 km/h (135 mph)
- Lowest pressure: 947 hPa (mbar); 27.96 inHg

Overall effects
- Fatalities: 1,200 total (Fourth-deadliest tropical cyclone recorded in the Southern Hemisphere)
- Damage: $9.75 million (1892 USD)
- Areas affected: Mauritius
- Part of the 1891-92 South-West Indian Ocean cyclone season

On April 29, 1892, a powerful tropical cyclone struck the island of Mauritius in the southwest Indian Ocean. At least 1,200 people died during the storm, and another 4,000 were injured, with 50,000 people left homeless, making the cyclone the third-deadliest tropical cyclone recorded in the South-West Indian Ocean basin, behind Cyclone Freddy in 2023 and Cyclone Idai in 2019. It is also the fourth-deadliest recorded in the Southern Hemisphere, behind the aforementioned Cyclones Freddy and Idai, and the 1973 Flores cyclone. The storm originated north of the island, and local meteorologists expected that the storm would remain away from the island. Consequentially, residents were unprepared until the arrival of the strong winds. For a span of 65 minutes, the calm of the storm's eye occurred on the island, before the winds again increased, reaching 195 km/h (121 mph), with gusts to 216 km/h (134 mph). During the storm, the barometric pressure dropped to 947 mbar (27.96 inHg), breaking the 74-year-old record for the lowest recorded pressure on the island.

The damage on Mauritius was so severe that contemporaneous newspapers questioned whether the island would recover. Damage was estimated at £2,000,000 (1892 GBP, $9.75 million USD).

== Meteorological history ==
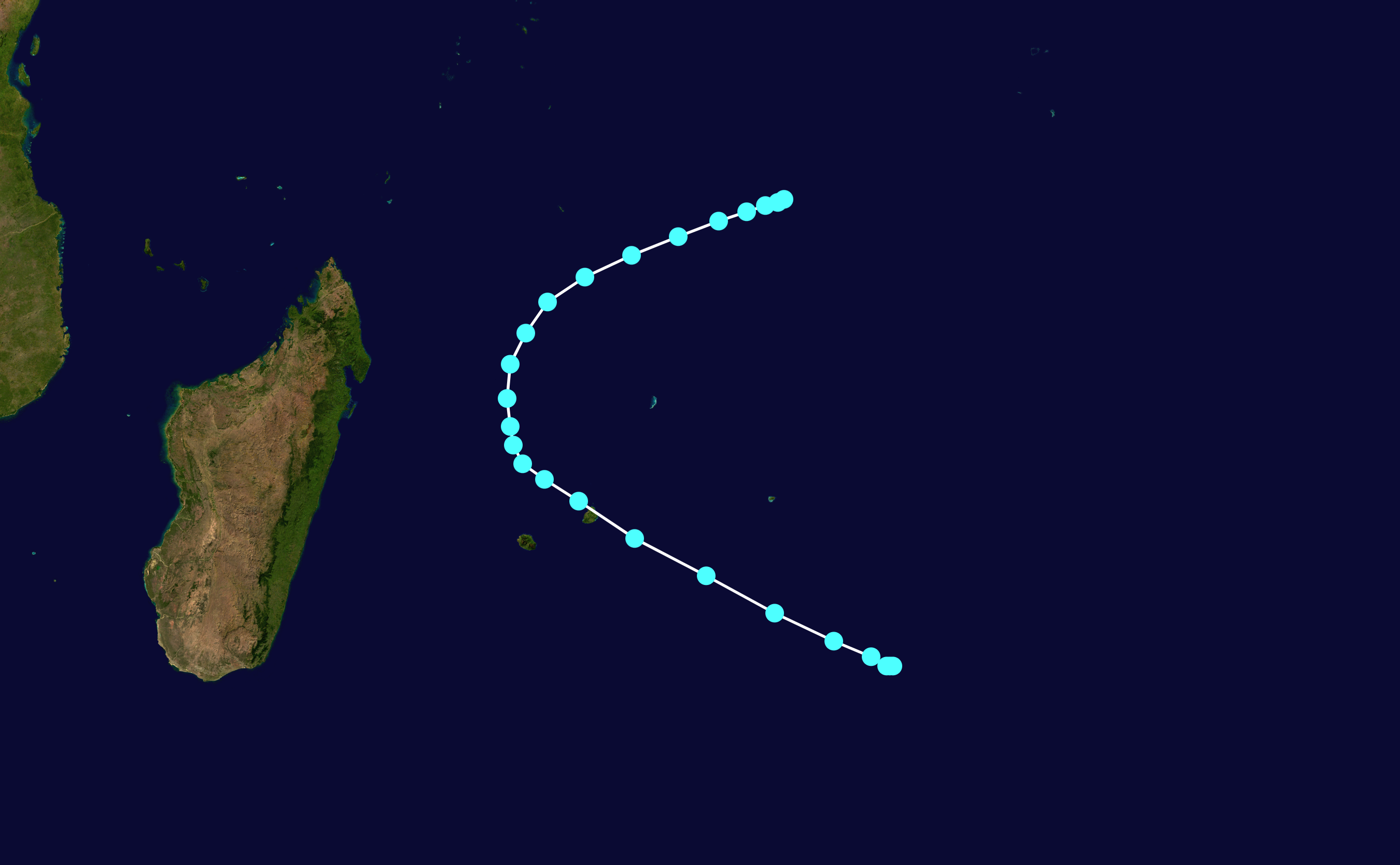
Map plotting the track of the Mauritius cyclone. Map key Saffir–Simpson scale Tropical depression (≤38 mph, ≤62 km/h) Tropical storm (39–73 mph, 63–118 km/h) Category 1 (74–95 mph, 119–153 km/h) Category 2 (96–110 mph, 154–177 km/h) Category 3 (111–129 mph, 178–208 km/h) Category 4 (130–156 mph, 209–251 km/h) Category 5 (≥157 mph, ≥252 km/h) Unknown Storm type Tropical cyclone Subtropical cyclone Extratropical cyclone, remnant low, tropical disturbance, or monsoon depression

Before the storm struck, Mauritius had never experienced a cyclone between 12 April and 1 December, which was considered outside of the cyclone season. The origins of the damaging cyclone are unclear. A report from the Royal Alfred Observatory on Mauritius noted that a large cyclone was moving southwestward on 24 April 1892, located north of the island. Over the next few days, the storm either recurved to the southeast, or generated a second smaller cyclone moving southeastward. Regardless, a powerful cyclone struck what was then the British colony of Mauritius on 29 April. From 1:25 to 2:30 pm that afternoon, the island experienced the eye of the storm for 65 minutes, before the winds again increased. At 2:30 pm, a weather station recorded a minimum pressure of 947 mbar (27.96 inHg); this was the lowest pressure ever recorded on Mauritius at the time, breaking the record set on 1 March 1818. At 3:47 pm, the weather station recorded maximum sustained winds of 195 km/h (121 mph). Wind gusts reached 216 km/h (134 mph), which would be the highest winds on the island until Cyclone Carol in 1960. There have been only six tropical cyclones producing a stronger wind gust since the 1892 storm: Carol, Jenny in 1962, Danielle in 1964, Gervaise in 1975, Claudette in 1979, and Dina in 2002. Cyclone Hollanda in 1994 tied the winds produced by the 1892 storm.

The cyclone also produced lightning on the island during its passage. Weather conditions quickly improved on Mauritius after the storm moved away from the island. The storm was unusual in its trajectory coming from the northwest; most other Mauritius cyclones struck from the northeast. The nomenclature for the weather phenomena on Mauritius was variously described as a blizzard, cyclone, hurricane, tornado, and whirlwind, although the size and scope of the storm meant it was not a proper tornado. A contemporaneous newspaper article described 29 April on the island as "Black Friday".

== Preparations and impact ==
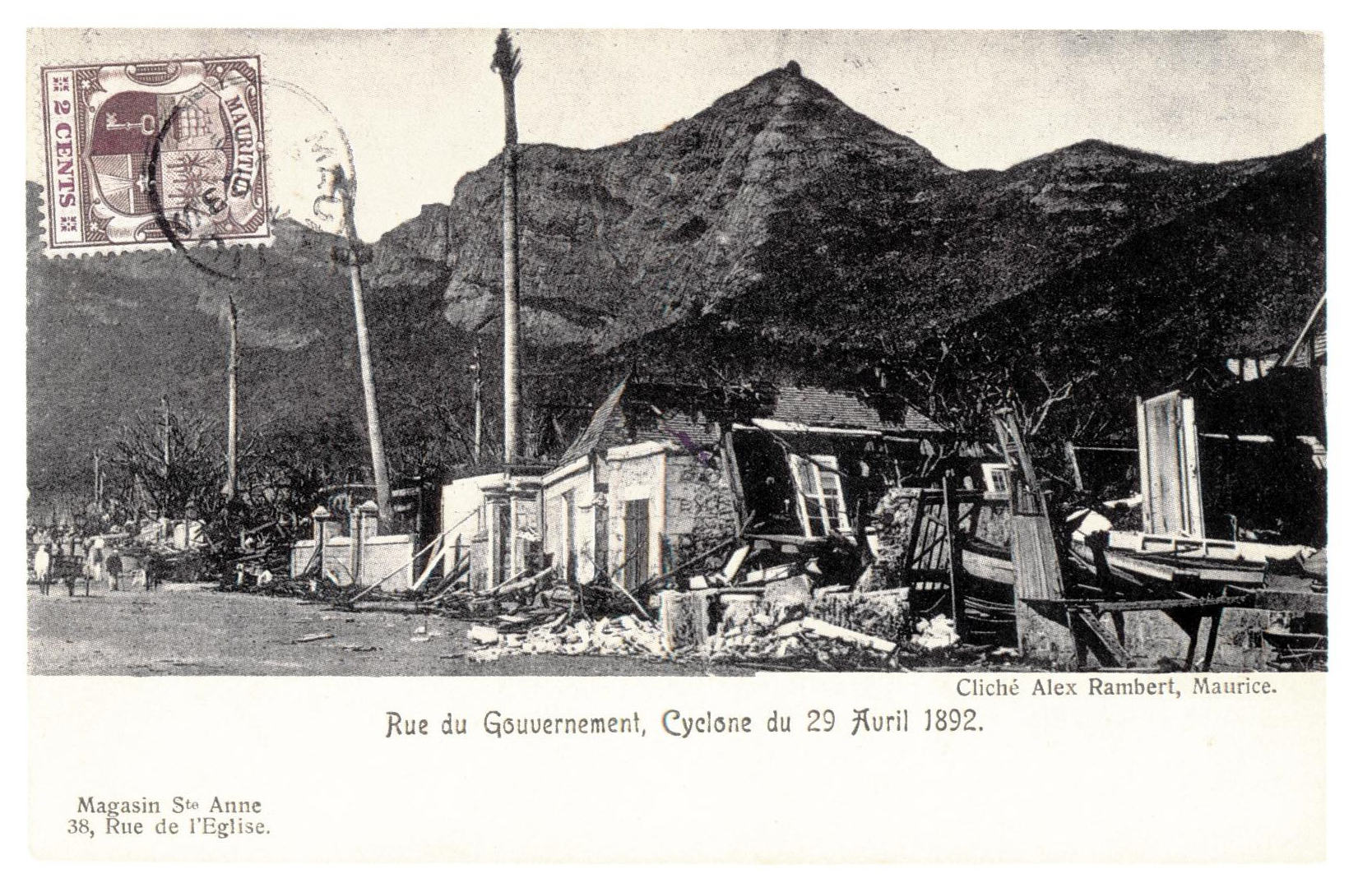
Storm damage in Port Louis

For several days, high waves affected northern Mauritius, but the cyclone to the north was expected to remain away from the island. On the morning that the cyclone arrived, the weather observatory sent a telegram, noting that "[the winds] will probably not exceed 90 km/h (56 mph)". This was the final warning before the telegraph lines snapped. Officials in the capital city Port Louis warned residents about the impending arrival of the storm by firing a cannon, followed by a gunshot. Responding to the warning, all traffic was halted, and residents secured doors and storms shutters. As most houses on the island were constructed of wood, the shutters served as the primary means of defense to the high winds. The island's ports were closed on the morning of the storm's arrival.

During a span of about six hours, the cyclone damaged most of the buildings on Mauritius, killed at least 1,200 people, and injured 4,000 others. Six villages were largely destroyed: Beau Bassin, Rose Hill, Phoenix, Vacoas, Rose-Belle, and Mahébourg-Souillac. Residents returned to business during the passage of the storm's eye, which was marked by the rain stopping and the appearance of the sun. After the eye passed, the winds increased from the opposite direction. Many residents were unprepared for the ferocity of the storm, which contributed to the high death toll. Strong winds damaged or destroyed most houses, leaving about 50,000 people homeless, and also wrecked 30 of the islands' 50 churches. The cyclone wrecked 75% of the island's sugar production facilities, completely decimating some plantations, which cut the sugar industry in half. Centuries-old trees were knocked down or stripped of their leaves, with about 200,000 trees knocked down on the island. Rail service was halted due to storm debris on the tracks. Damage on Mauritius was estimated at £2,000,000 (1892 GBP, $9.75 million USD).

About one third of Port Louis was destroyed during the storm, with 1,500 houses wrecked and 20,000 people left homeless. There were at least 596 fatalities in the city. Intense clouds gathered in the mountains above the city and unleashed a torrent. High waters sank a dozen barges in the harbor, and washed at least 13 ships onto land, some 6.1 m (20 ft) above sea level. During the storm, at least ten fires broke out in Port Louis, which destroyed 16 houses, and burnt several injured residents to death. The storm destroyed churches and schools, including the Royal College. High winds knocked down trees, lifted the roofs of houses, and flung deadly airborne debris. The winds also knocked out telegraph lines, limiting communications, and damaged rail lines, interrupting travel.

== Aftermath ==
After the storm, military members and civilians transported the deceased residents of Mauritius by cart through the damaged streets, burying the dead in public cemeteries. Injured residents were carried and treated to the few buildings left standing, while homeless residents were housed in the barracks and the immigration building. Soldiers patrolled the streets of Port Louis to prevent looting. Under order from the island's colonial governor Thomas Elliott, churches were allowed to take rice and tea for injured storm victims. Responding to the death toll from the storm, flags were ordered to be flown at half-mast for eight days. Contemporaneous newspapers questioned whether the island would be able to recover from the storm.

The lord mayor started a relief fund to raise funds for rebuilding. Mauritius administrator Eugène P. J. Leclézio requested assistance from the British government, estimating the cost of rebuilding at £800,000. The British government granted loan to farmers, to be repaid after 20 years, to prevent them from going bankrupt. Nearby Réunion island and Seychelles sent resources to Mauritius to assist in rebuilding. Other residents in the British Empire helped the colony rebuild. The United Society Partners in the Gospel raised £1,114 to rebuild damaged churches.

== See also ==
- Tropical cyclones in the Mascarene Islands
- Cyclone Hollanda (1994) – another strong tropical cyclone that caused extensive damage in Mauritius
- Cyclone Leon–Eline (2000) – a long-lived tropical cyclone that devastated Mozambique
- Cyclone Dina (2002) – a powerful cyclone that also severely affected Mauritius more than a century later
- Cyclone Idai (2019) – the deadliest tropical cyclone recorded in the South-West Indian Ocean basin, which devastated the nations west of the Mozambique Channel
