= Cyclone Amara =

South-West Indian tropical cyclone in 2013

Intense Tropical Cyclone Amara
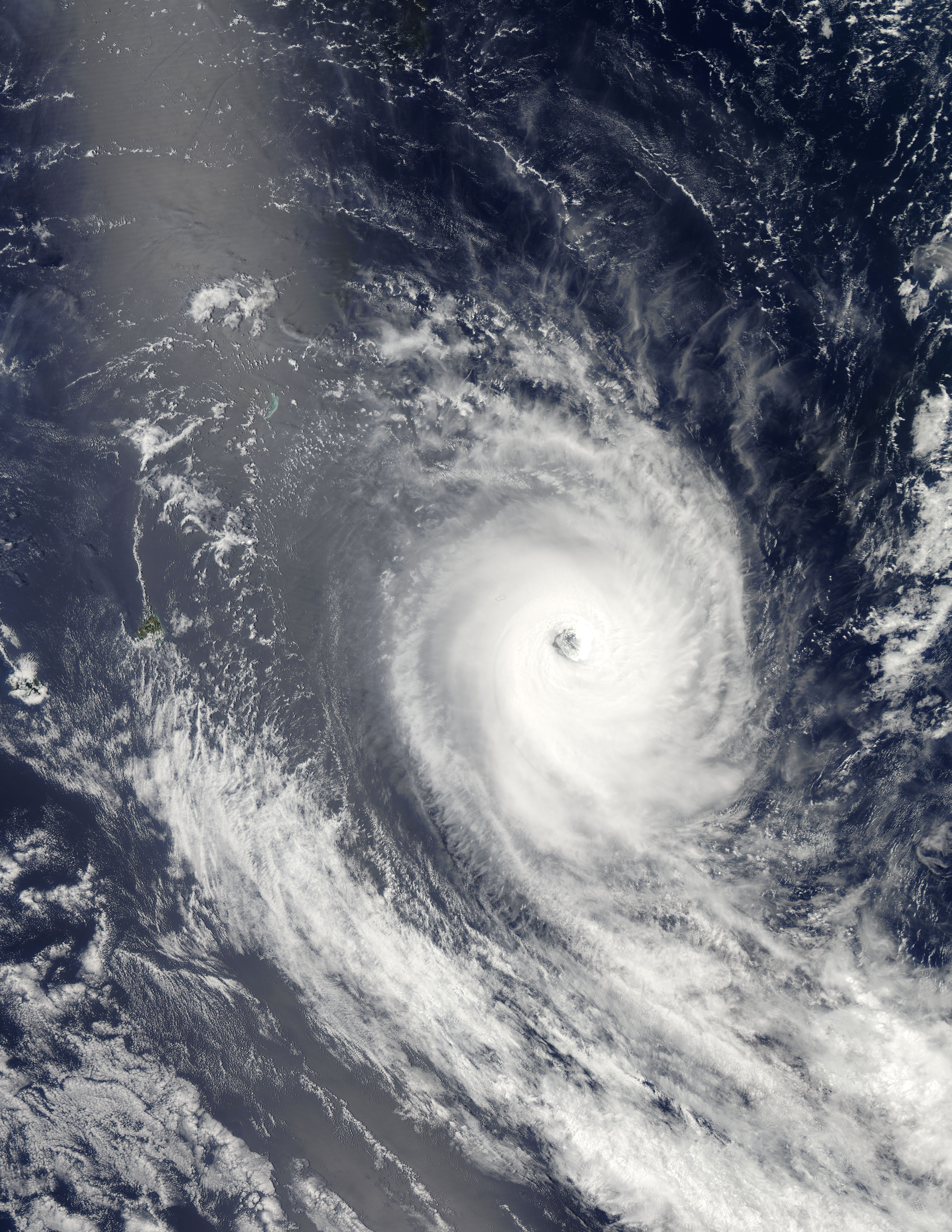
- Cyclone Amara on December 21, along with Réunion and Mauritius

Meteorological history
- Formed: December 15, 2013
- Remnant low: December 23, 2013
- Dissipated: December 27, 2013

Intense tropical cyclone
- 10-minute sustained (MF)
- Highest winds: 205 km/h (125 mph)
- Highest gusts: 285 km/h (180 mph)
- Lowest pressure: 935 hPa (mbar); 27.61 inHg

Category 4-equivalent tropical cyclone
- 1-minute sustained (SSHWS/JTWC)
- Highest winds: 240 km/h (150 mph)
- Lowest pressure: 926 hPa (mbar); 27.34 inHg

Overall effects
- Fatalities: None
- Damage: None
- Areas affected: Rodrigues
- IBTrACS /
- Part of the 2013–14 South-West Indian Ocean cyclone season

Intense Tropical Cyclone Amara was a very strong tropical cyclone which brought stormy conditions to Rodrigues in December 2013. Amara was the first named storm in the southwest Indian Ocean during the later half of 2013, and developed from a disturbance within the monsoon trough on December 15. The following day, the system attained tropical depression status. Despite its ill-defined organization, the depression was able to continue strengthening, reaching moderate tropical storm status on December 16 as it tracked southwest. Situated in a favorable atmospheric environment, a period of rapid intensification ensued after Amara reached tropical cyclone status on December 18. After fluctuating in strength, the cyclone peaked with maximum sustained winds of 205 km/h (125 mph) and a minimum barometric pressure of 935 mbar (hPa; 27.61 inHg) on December 21, (Note: All measurements of maximum sustained wind are measured or estimated over a period of ten minutes unless otherwise noted.) making it an intense tropical cyclone based on the intensity scale utilized by Météo-France. Shortly after, wind shear increased as Amara tracked southeast, resulting in a weakening phase. The shearing effects caused the cyclone to rapidly decay, and by December 23, Amara degenerated into a remnant low.

Amara was initially expected to track directly over the island of Rodrigues, prompting widespread precautionary measures and resulting in the issuance of a Class 4 warning – denoting a warning of highest urgency – by the Mauritius Meteorological Services. Though the tropical cyclone eventually passed to the east of the island, Amara was close enough to Rodrigues to severely affect the island. Strong winds, peaking at a measured 152 km/h (94 mph) in Pointe Canon, resulted in widespread infrastructural damage, including the tearing of metal sheeting and uprooting of trees. Widespread power outages cut power to 12,000 homes and shut off communications to and from the island. Heavy rains produced by Amara also triggered flooding in some locations and caused soil erosion.

== Meteorological history ==
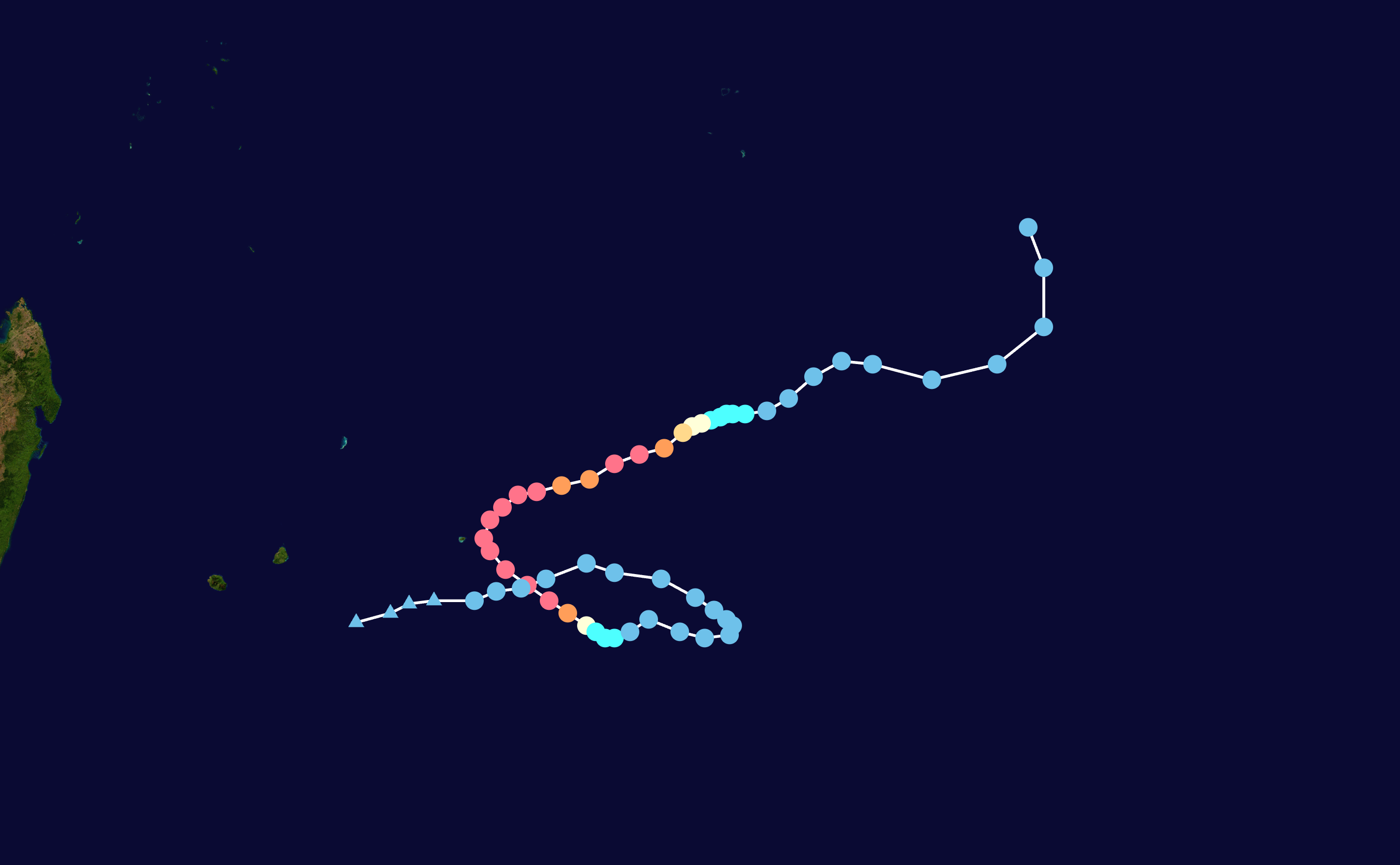
Map plotting the storm's track and intensity, according to the Saffir–Simpson scale Map key Saffir–Simpson scale Tropical depression (≤38 mph, ≤62 km/h) Tropical storm (39–73 mph, 63–118 km/h) Category 1 (74–95 mph, 119–153 km/h) Category 2 (96–110 mph, 154–177 km/h) Category 3 (111–129 mph, 178–208 km/h) Category 4 (130–156 mph, 209–251 km/h) Category 5 (≥157 mph, ≥252 km/h) Unknown Storm type Tropical cyclone Subtropical cyclone Extratropical cyclone, remnant low, tropical disturbance, or monsoon depression

The origin of Amara can be traced back to an area of low pressure embedded within a monsoon trough southeast of Diego Garcia on December 13, 2013. Computer models suggested that surrounding atmospheric conditions would later become more conducive for tropical cyclogenesis. Over the course of the day, the localized area of circulation remained sheared, though convection remained persistent. Despite the hindering atmospheric environment, the system organized faster than anticipated, and was classified as a tropical disturbance by Météo-France at 1200 UTC on December 14. Shortly after development, the disturbance underwent a reformation phase and consequently a new center of circulation developed, allowing the system to reach tropical depression status early on December 15. Nonetheless, the storm's overall structure remained ill-defined due to the presence of wind shear and multiple mesovortices.

At 1330 UTC on December 16, the Mauritius Meteorological Services designated the system as a moderate tropical storm, thus assigning it the name Amara. At the time the storm had a minimum barometric pressure estimated at 995 mbar (hPa; 29.39 inHg). During the subsequent hours, the storm began to slowly track west-southwest under the periphery of a nearby subtropical ridge. Amara's circulation center consolidated and rainbands became more tightly wrapped around the center, at which time the Joint Typhoon Warning Center (JTWC) began to monitor the system. Late on December 17, Amara began to develop an eye, observable via microwave imagery. Based on the antecedent developments, Météo-France upgraded the system to severe tropical storm intensity at 0000 UTC the following day. Nine hours later, the JTWC upgraded Amara to tropical cyclone intensity, with Météo-France following suit three hours later. Situated in a location with low vertical wind shear and outspread outflow, Amara was forecast to continue strengthening, though at the same time the cyclone was expected to move very slowly due to its interaction with weak steering currents in between two subtropical ridges. Rapid intensification ensued throughout the latter hours of December 18, coinciding with the development of a ragged eye feature within the tropical cyclone on infrared imagery. Météo-France upgraded Amara to intense tropical cyclone status at 0000 UTC on December 19. By this time the storm's central pressure had fallen to 944 mbar (hPa; 27.88 inHg). Shortly after, however, Amara's once well-defined outflow pattern became suppressed, resulting in a slight weakening and a downgrade from intense tropical cyclone status just twelve hours later.

This weakening phase was brief, and shortly thereafter Amara was reclassified as an intense tropical cyclone on December 21. At 0600 UTC that day, Amara reached its peak intensity as an intense tropical cyclone with maximum sustained winds of 205 km/h (125 mph) and a minimum pressure of 933 mbar (hPa; 27.55 inHg). Following peak intensity, an approaching upper-level, mid-latitude trough increased wind shear and forced the storm towards the southeast, resulting in the cyclone weakening. By 0600 UTC the next day, Météo-France determined that Amara had weakened below intense tropical cyclone status. The strong wind shear continued to take its toll on the cyclone, stripping away and exposing Amara's low-level circulation center away from the rest of its associated convection. At 1200 UTC on December 22, Amara weakened to severe tropical storm intensity, and was later downgraded further to tropical depression intensity the following day. Amara's downgrade to such an intensity marked the cessation of Météo-France's tropical cyclone bulletins. The remnant vortex associated with Amara continued to persist over the next few days and curved westward, though it lacked persistent convection. The remnant circulation gradually became increasingly diffused and was last noted by Météo-France at 1200 UTC on December 28.

== Preparations and impact ==
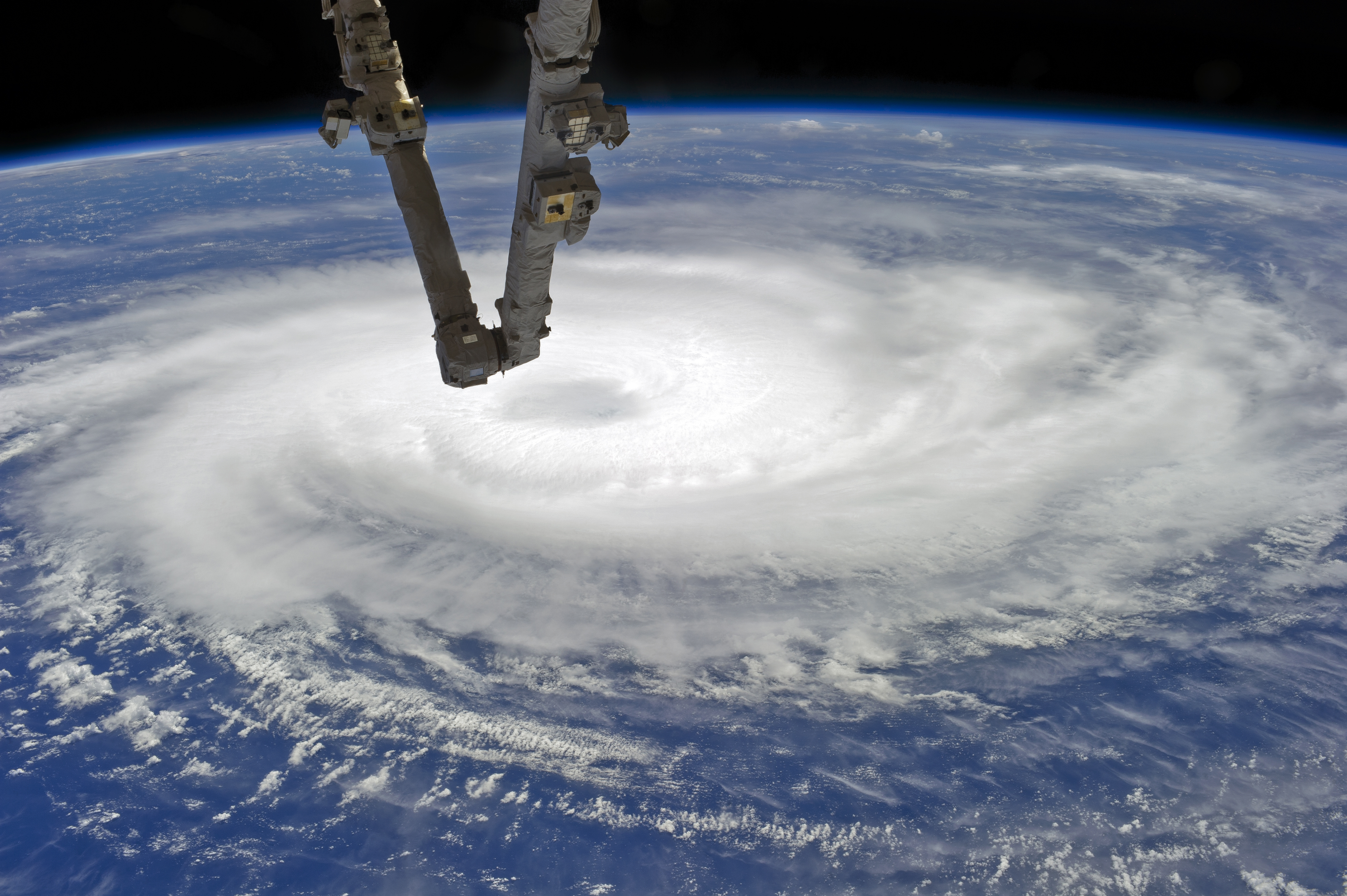
ISS view of Tropical Cyclone Amara on December 20.

Due to Amara's projected path near Rodrigues, the Mauritius Meteorological Services issued a "Class 1" warning for the island early on December 19, following the cyclone's upgrade to intense tropical cyclone intensity. Hours later, the meteorological service upgraded their warning to a "Class 2." Based on forecasts that continued to indicate that Amara would track directly over Rodrigues, the Mauritius Meteorological Services issued a "Class 3 warning" in the morning hours of December 20, describing Amara as a "real threat for Rodrigues." This resulted in a complete suspension of flights to and from the island. These cancellations were attributable to Air Mauritius, which was the only air carrier for Rodrigues. Fishing boats were rerouted back to the island and refugee centers readied their resources in preparation for the tropical cyclone. Large scale precautionary measures took place in Port Mathurin. On December 21, Mauritius Meteorological Services issued their highest applicable cyclone warning, a "Class 4 warning," for Rodrigues.

Rodrigues began to experience the effects of Amara on December 20, when strong gusts caused by the tropical cyclone swept across the island. These initial winds uprooted trees and toppled utility poles, resulting in power outages. At the height of power outages, over 12,000 households were without power, primarily in Port Sud-Est, Mount Lubin, and Rivière-Cocos. By the afternoon of December 22, only 20% of homes had access to electricity. Some of the fallen trees rendered roads impassable. Heavy rains caused some creeks to overflow their banks, and riffles became impassable. The rainfall also caused extensive soil erosion. Amara also triggered a strong storm surge, resulting in coastal flooding. Despite the heavy rainfall, total precipitation amounts remained relatively low, peaking at 78 mm (3.07 in) in Citronelle. On December 21, a wind gust of 152 km/h (94 mph) was reported in the locality of Pointe Canon, which was the highest wind measurement recorded in associated with Amara. Another station at Sir Gaëtan Duval Airport reported a similarly strong wind gust clocked at 135 km/h (84 mph). The strong winds tore metal sheets off of buildings and cut telecommunications between Rodrigues and the rest of the world. Despite the widespread precautionary measures taken beforehand, Port Mathurin suffered marginal impacts. Following the storm, local police groups and the Special Mobile Force were mobilized in order to assist in relief efforts. Technicians from the Mauritius Central Electricity Board were dispatched to resolve power issues.

== See also ==
- Tropical cyclones in the Mascarene Islands
- Cyclone Bejisa
- Cyclone Dina
- Cyclone Kalunde
- Cyclone Adeline–Juliet
