= 1974–75 Southern Hemisphere tropical cyclone season =

The 1974–75 Southern Hemisphere tropical cyclone season comprises three different basins. Their respective seasons are:

- 1974–75 South-West Indian Ocean cyclone season west of 90°E,
- 1974–75 Australian region cyclone season between 90°E and 160°E, and
- 1974–75 South Pacific cyclone season east of 160°E.
