= 1974–75 South-West Indian Ocean cyclone season =

Cyclone season in the Southwest Indian Ocean

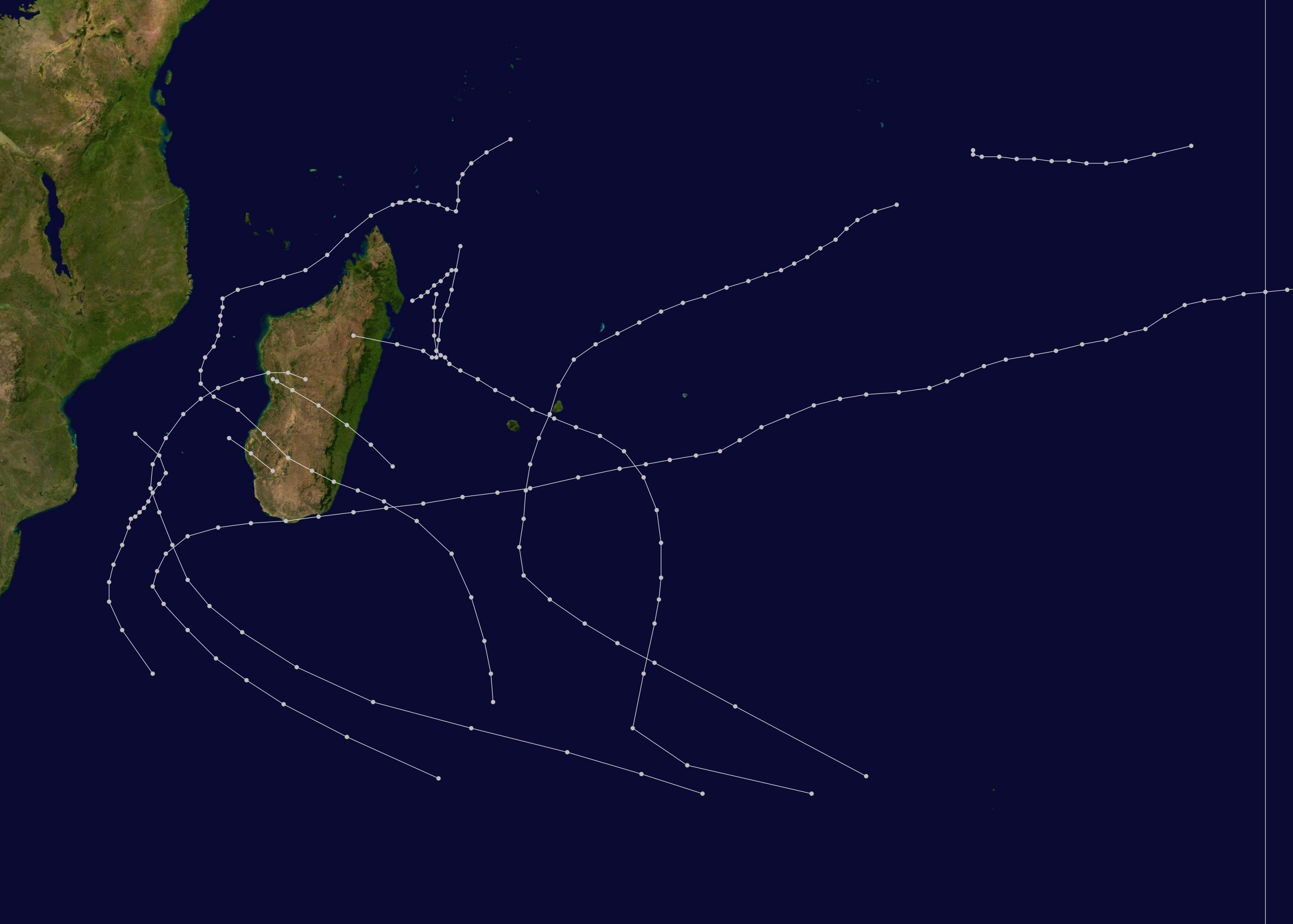
- Season summary map

Seasonal boundaries
- First system formed: 23 December 1974
- Last system dissipated: 22 April 1975

Strongest storm
- Name: Gervaise
  - Maximum winds: 120 km/h (75 mph) (10-minute sustained)
  - Lowest pressure: 951 hPa (mbar)

Seasonal statistics
- Total disturbances: 10
- Total depressions: 8
- Total storms: 6
- Tropical cyclones: 5
- Intense tropical cyclones: 2
- Total fatalities: 9 total
- Total damage: Unknown

Related articles
- 1974–75 Australian region cyclone season; 1974–75 South Pacific cyclone season

The 1974–75 South-West Indian Ocean cyclone season was an average cyclone season. The season officially ran from November 1, 1974, to April 30, 1975.

== Systems ==
=== Tropical Disturbance Adele ===
- Tropical disturbance (MFR)
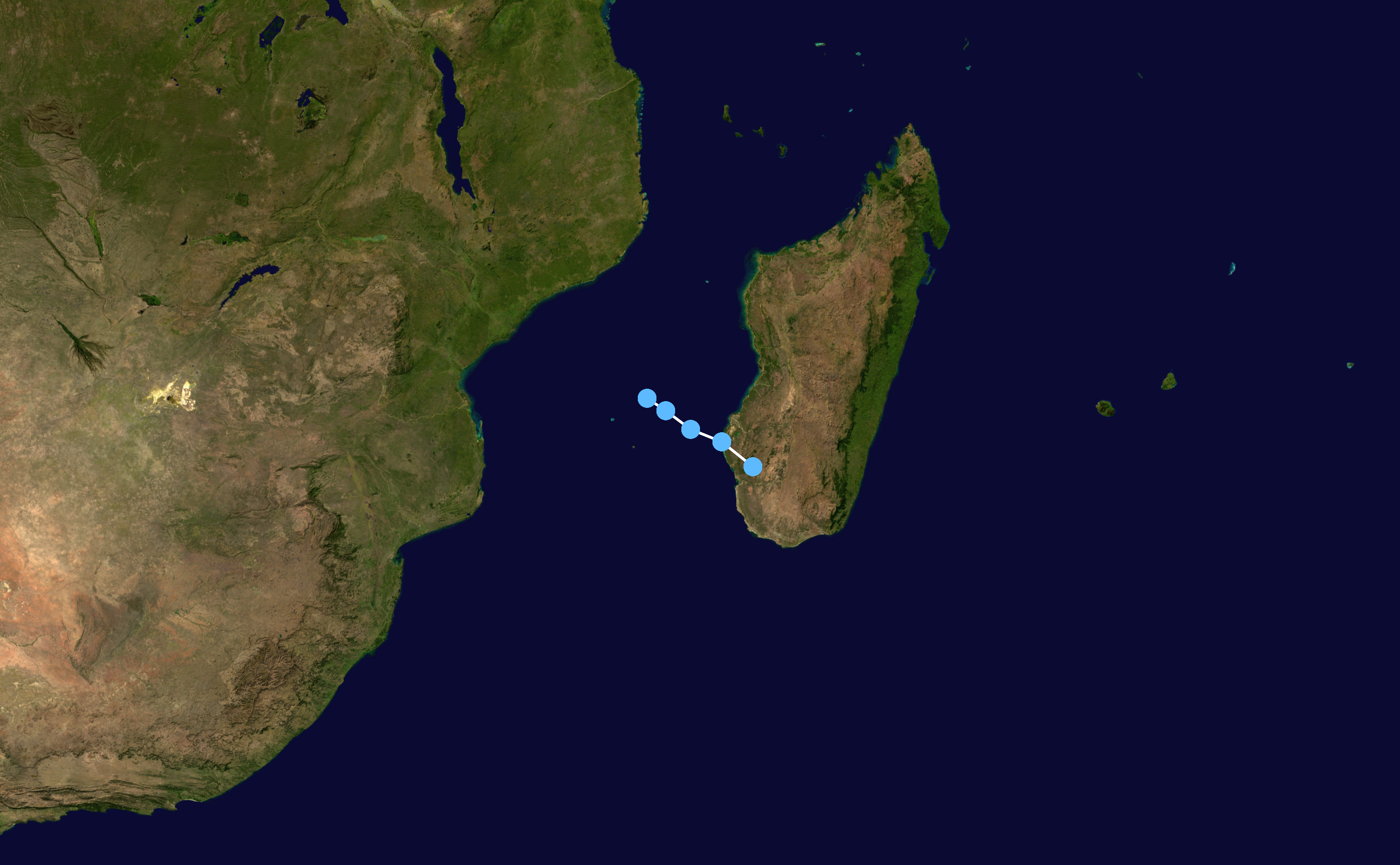
- Duration: December 23 – December 24
- Peak intensity: Winds not specified;

Adele existed from December 23 to December 24.

=== Intense Tropical Cyclone Blandine ===
- Intense tropical cyclone (MFR)
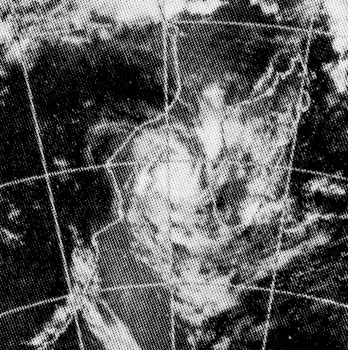
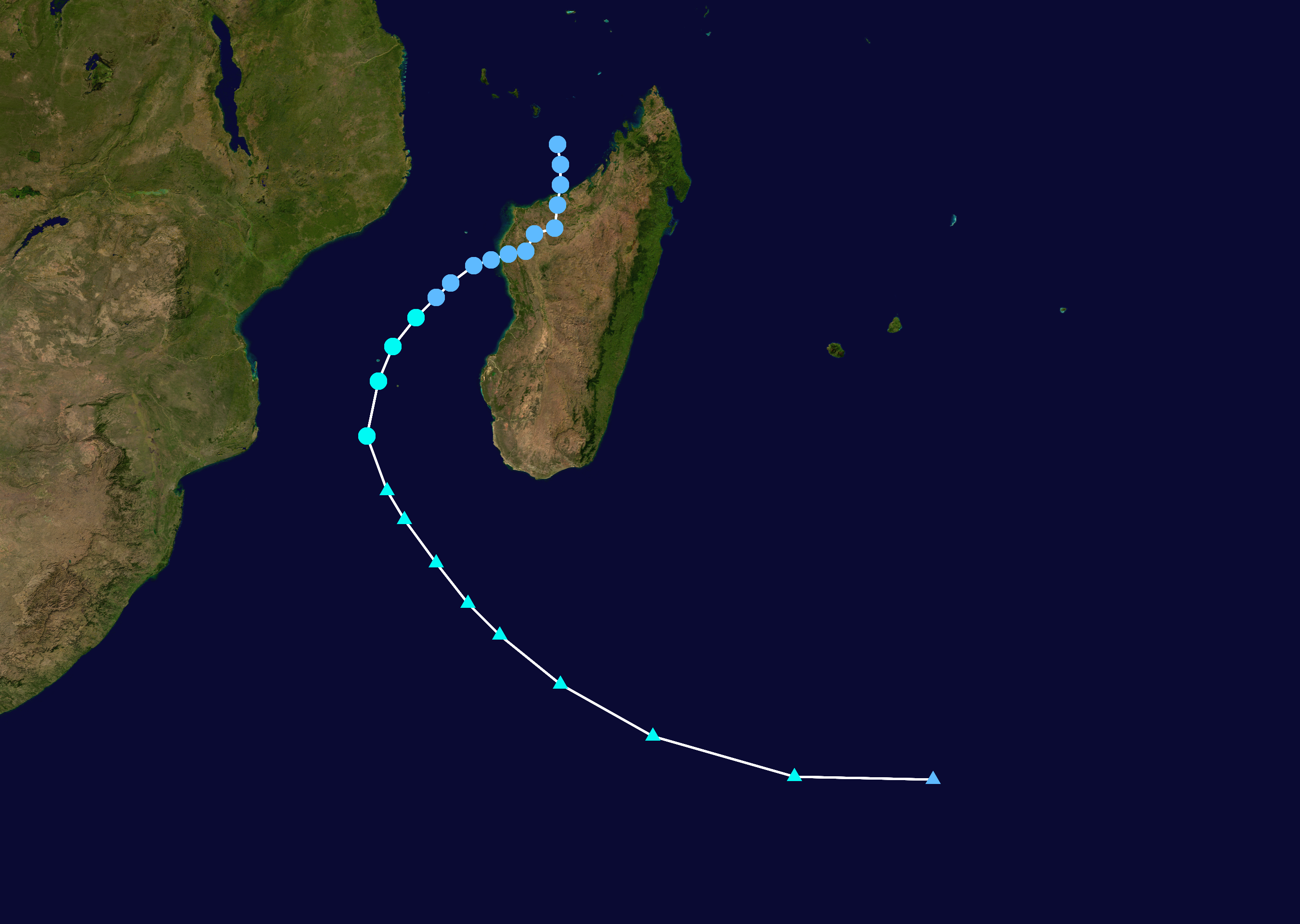
- Duration: January 6 – January 12
- Peak intensity: 175 km/h (110 mph) (10-min); 980 hPa (mbar)

Blandine existed from January 6 to January 12.

=== Tropical Cyclone Camille ===
- Tropical cyclone (MFR)
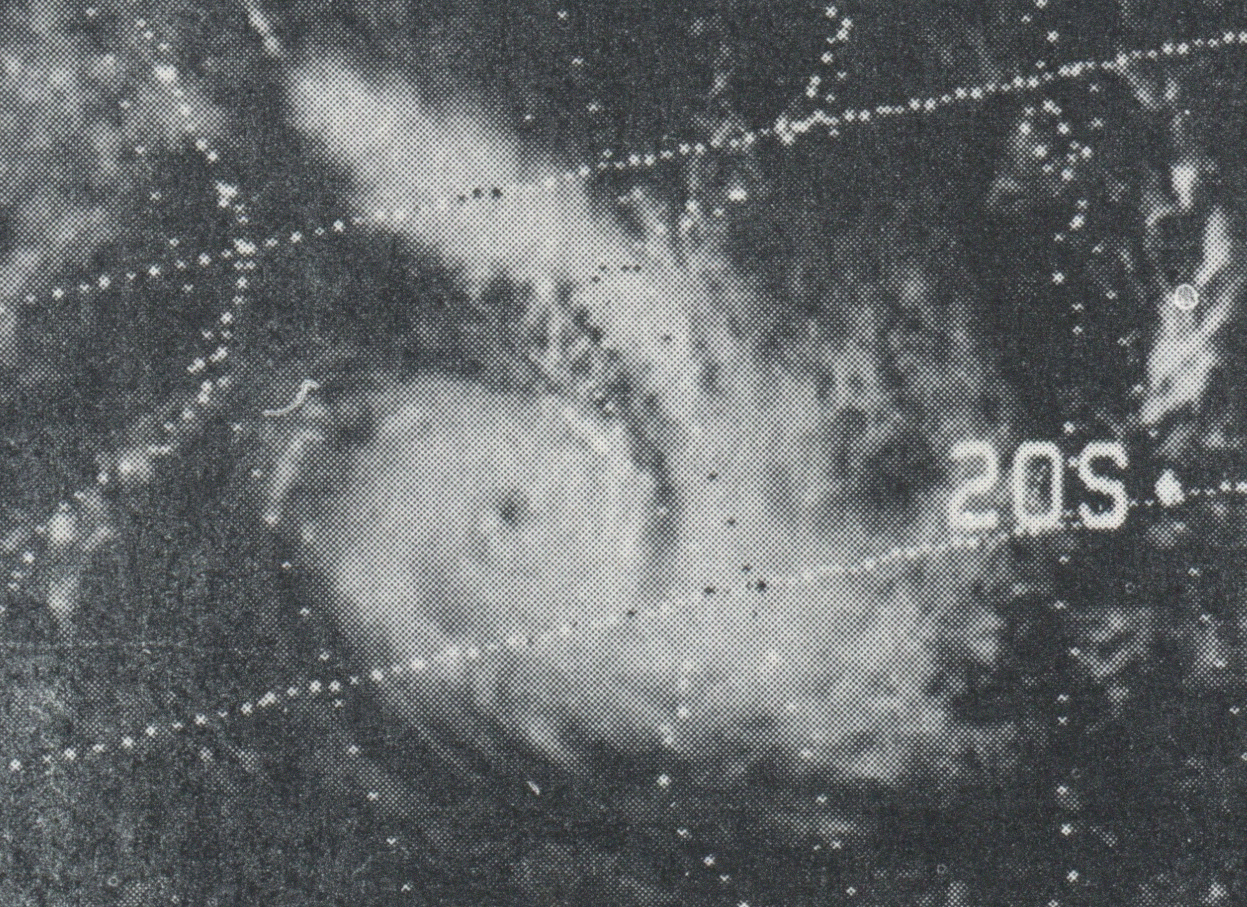
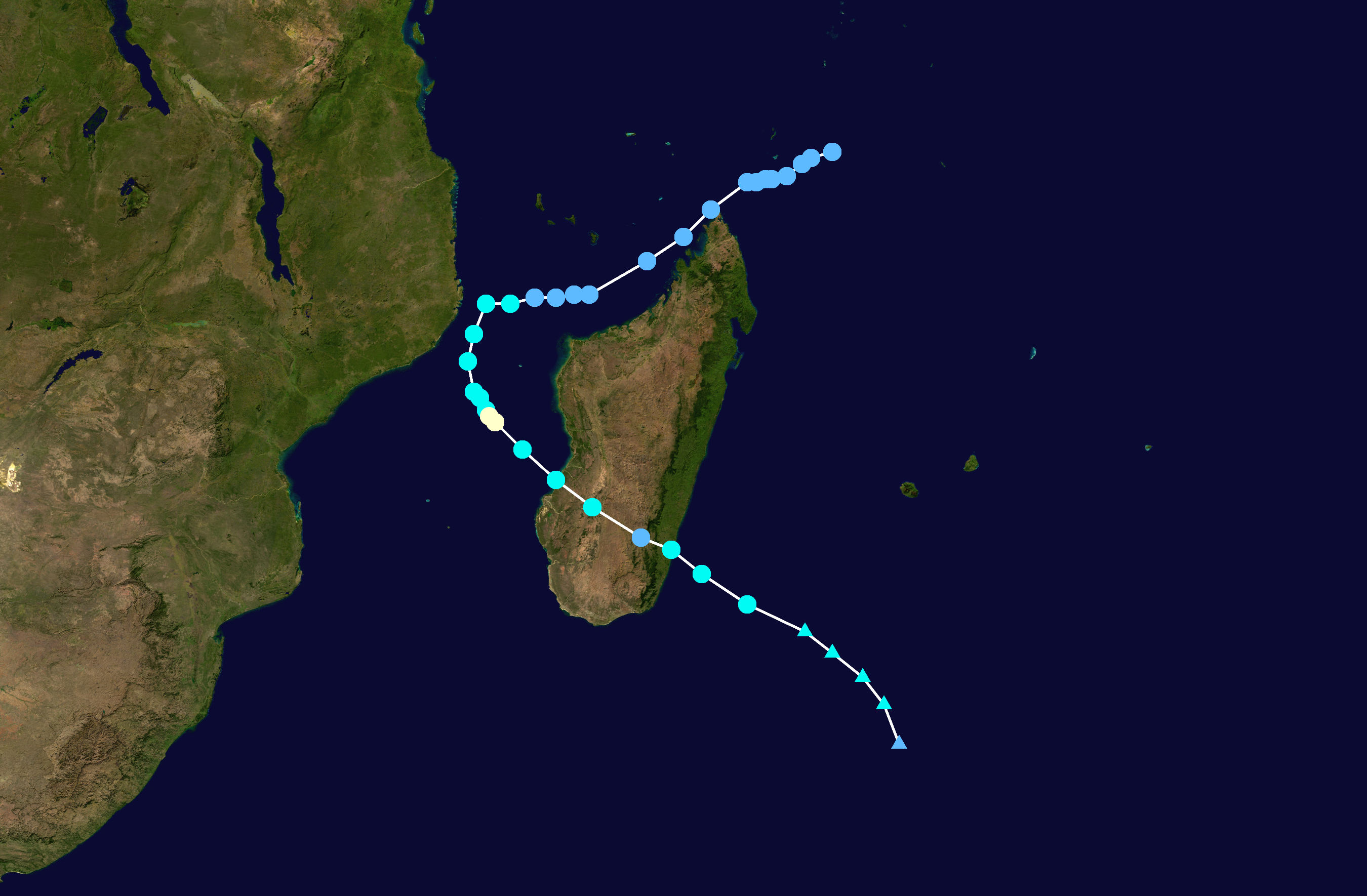
- Duration: January 10 – January 21
- Peak intensity: 150 km/h (90 mph) (10-min); 995 hPa (mbar)

This system formed southeast of the Seychelles on January 7 before becoming disorganized while interacting with northern Madagascar. The system redeveloped as a hurricane-force cyclone in the northern Mozambique Channel on January 16 before moving southeast into Madagascar on January 19.

=== Intense Tropical Cyclone Robyn–Deborah ===
- Intense tropical cyclone (MFR)
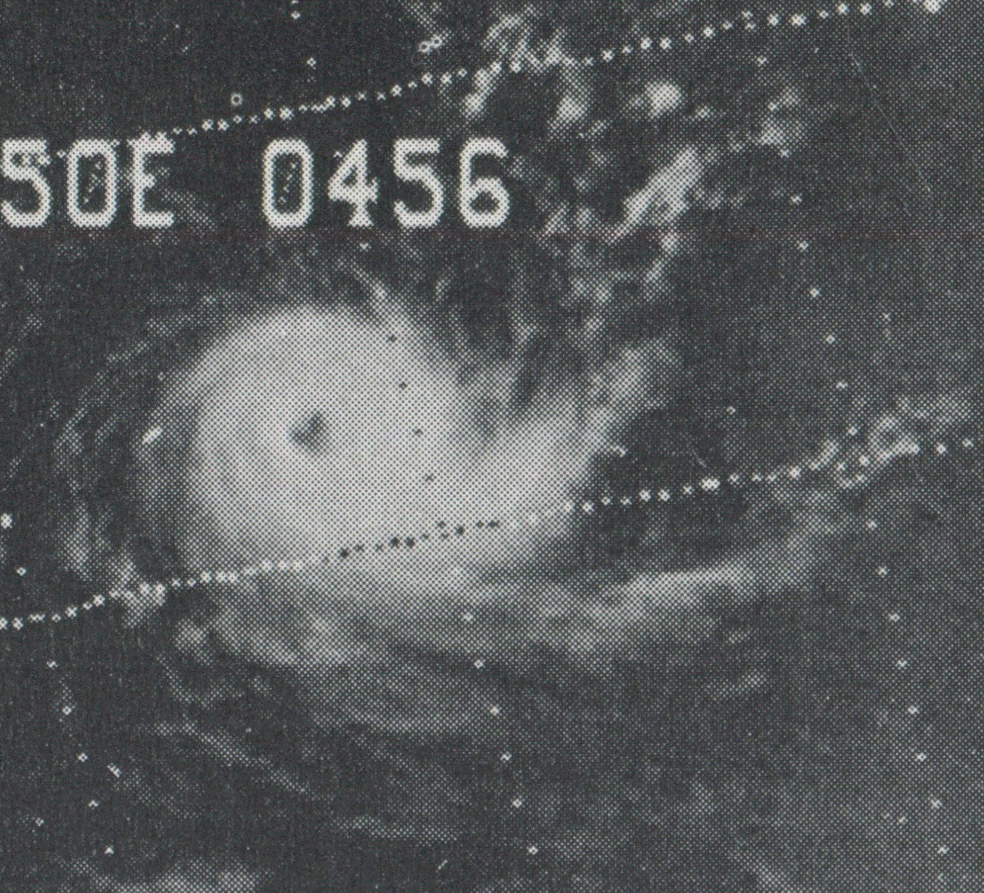
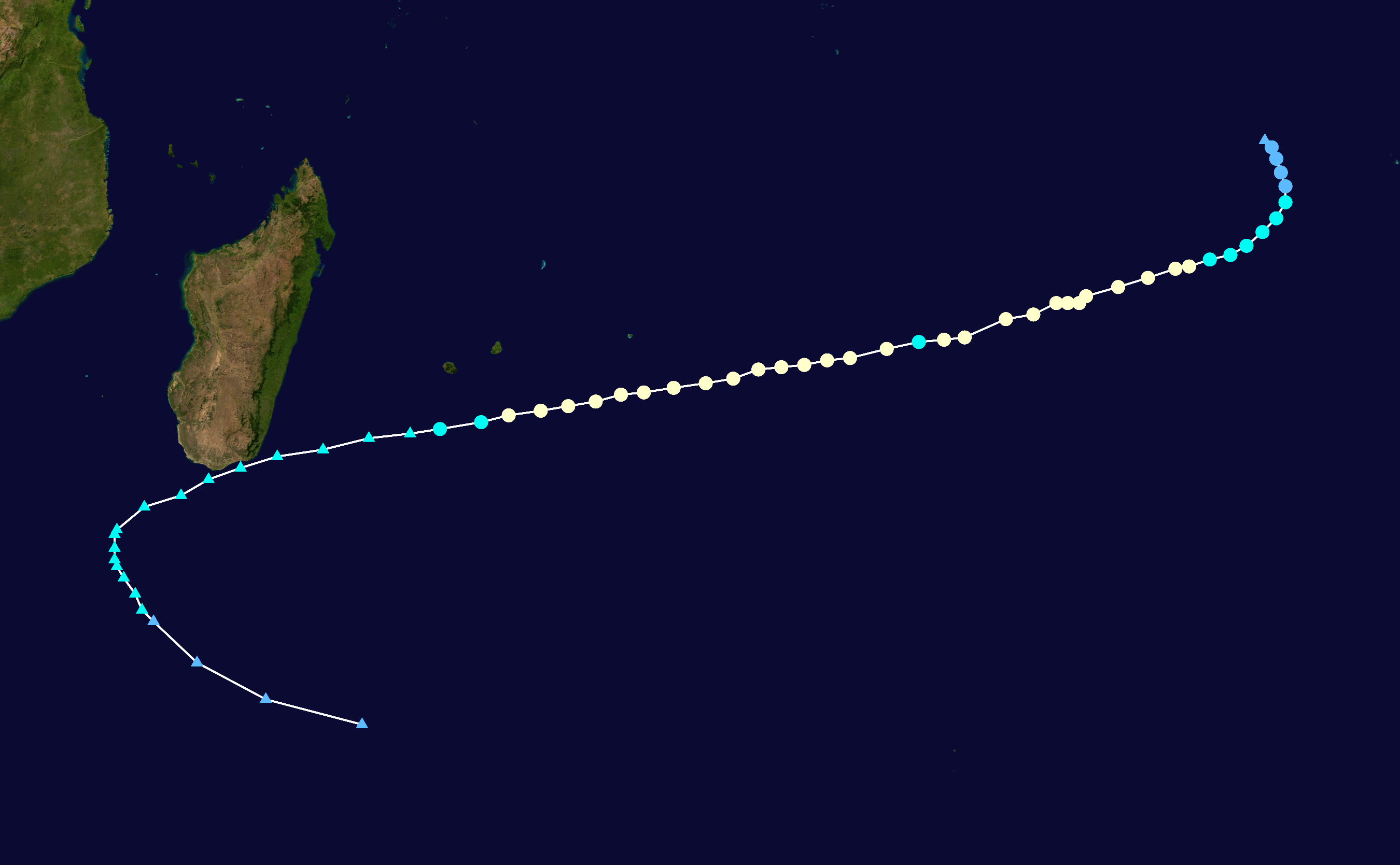
- Duration: January 14 – January 24
- Peak intensity: 185 km/h (115 mph) (10-min); 960 hPa (mbar)

This system existed from January 14 to January 24.

=== Tropical Depression Elsa ===
- Tropical depression (MFR)
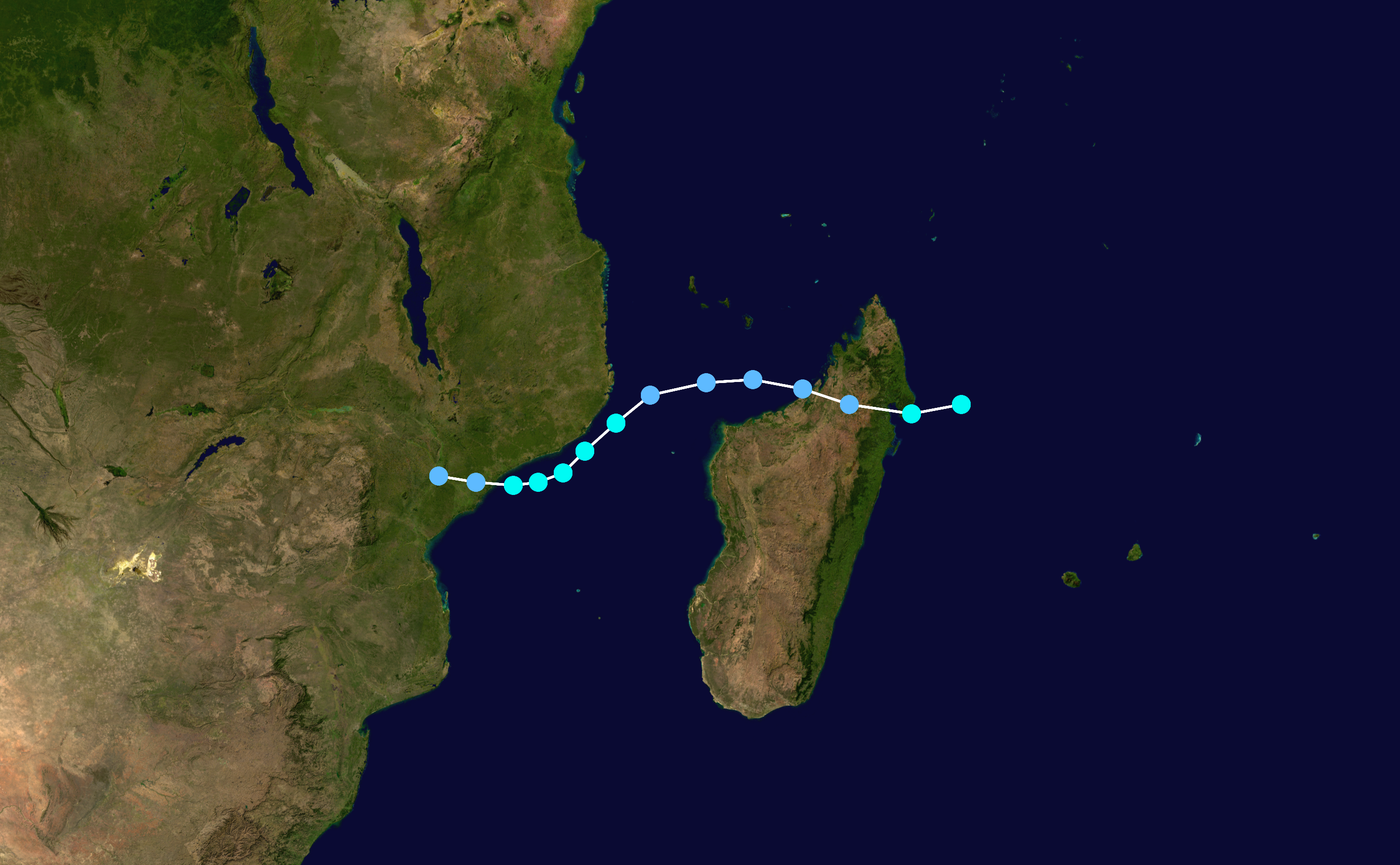
- Duration: January 25 – January 27
- Peak intensity: 55 km/h (35 mph) (10-min);

Elsa existed from January 25 to January 27.

=== Tropical Disturbance Fernande ===
- Tropical disturbance (MFR)
- Tropical depression (SSHWS)
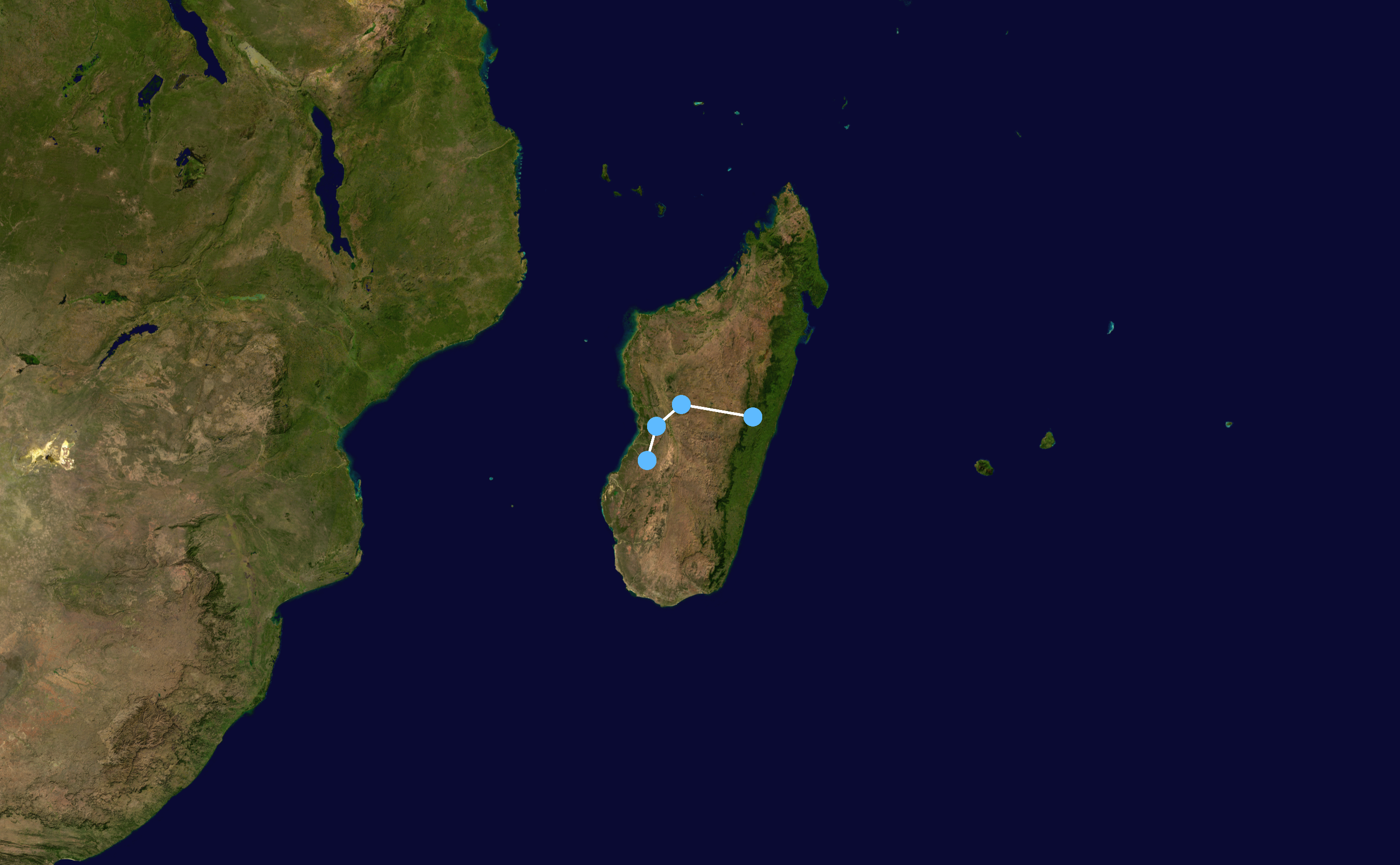
- Duration: February 1 – February 1
- Peak intensity: 55 km/h (35 mph) (1-min);

This storm lasted for only 18 hours on February 1.

=== Intense Tropical Cyclone Gervaise ===
- Intense tropical cyclone (MFR)
- Category 4 tropical cyclone (SSHWS)
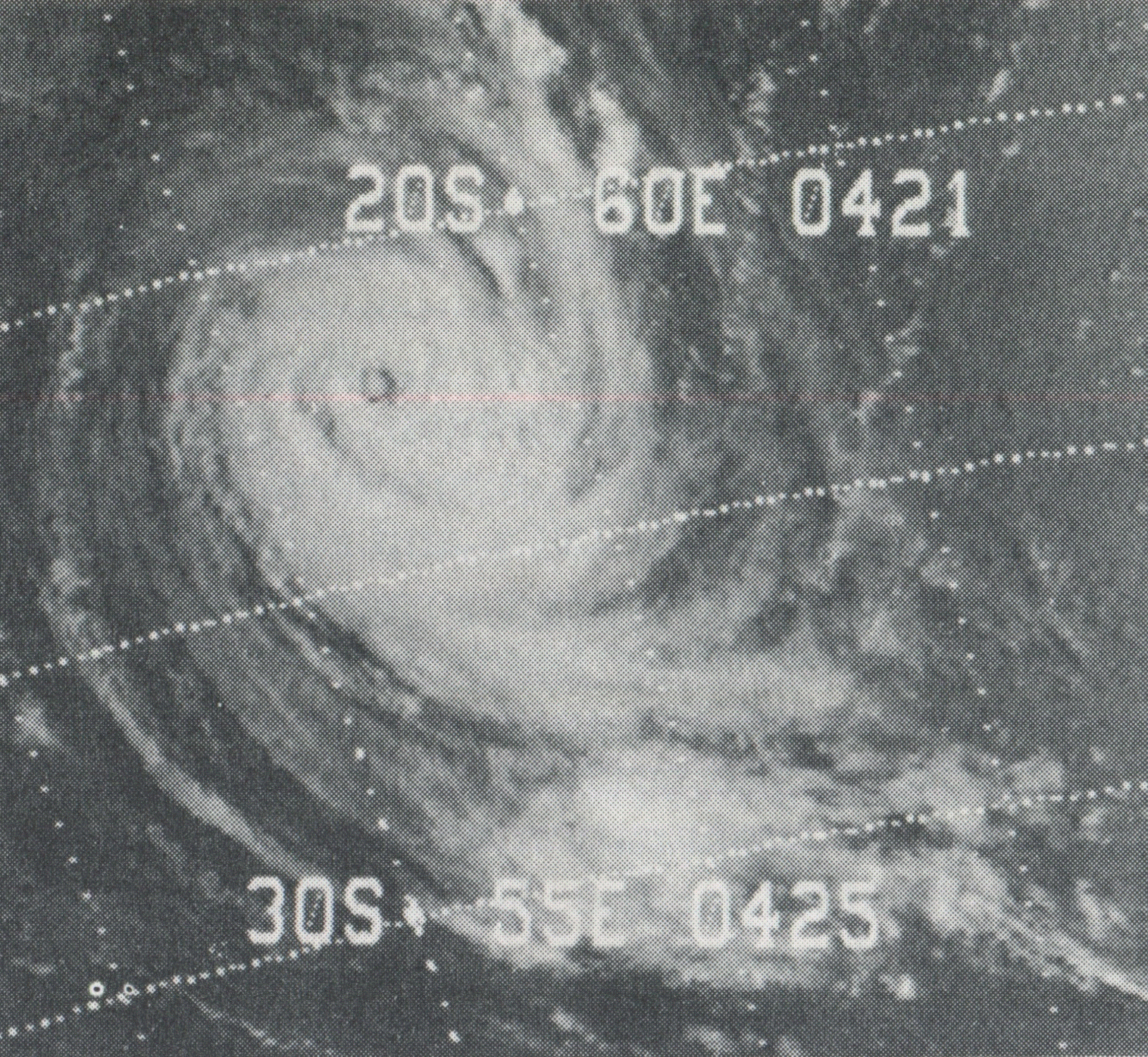
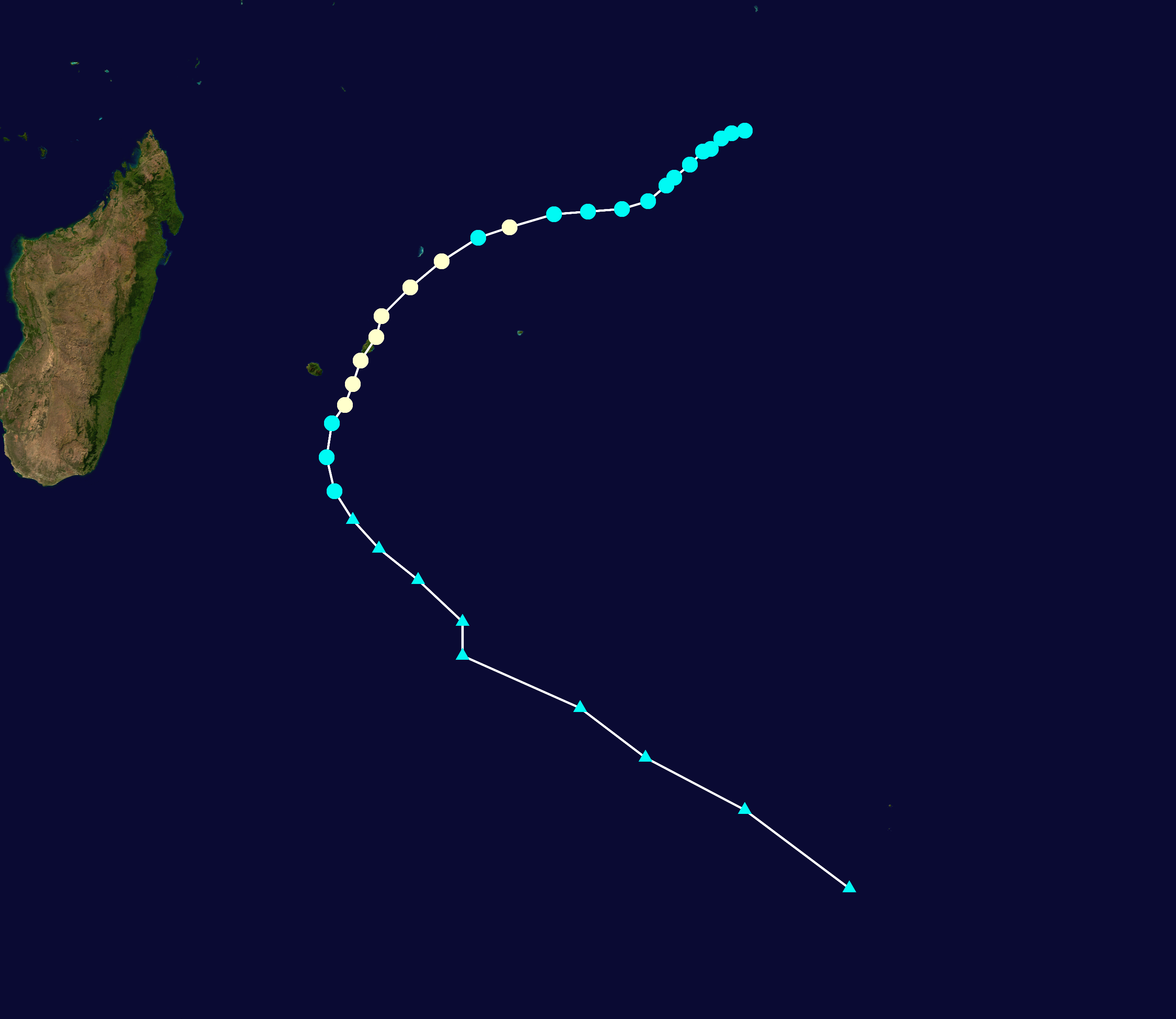
- Duration: February 1 – February 10
- Peak intensity: 195 km/h (120 mph) (10-min); 951 hPa (mbar)

The origins of Cyclone Gervaise were in early February 1975 from a circular area of convection, or thunderstorms, located in the Intertropical Convergence Zone southwest of Diego Garcia in the south-west Indian Ocean. The system organized as it moved generally to the southwest, a trajectory it would maintain for several days due to a subtropical ridge to its southeast, and an area of low pressure near the Mascarene Islands. On February 2, the Mauritius Meteorological Services (Note: Météo-France's meteorological office in Réunion (MFR) is the official Regional Specialized Meteorological Center for the South-West Indian Ocean, tracking all tropical cyclones from the east coast of Africa to 90° E. The Mauritius Meteorological Office is responsible for naming storms in the eastern east of 55° E.) named the storm Gervaise. Two days later, the storm attained hurricane status, or maximum sustained winds of at least 120 km/h (75 mph). Late on February 5, Gervaise passed about 100 km (60 mi) southeast of St. Brandon. Continuing southwestward, the cyclone struck Mauritius on February 6, with the calm of the eye lasting for three hours. That day, the American-based Joint Typhoon Warning Center (JTWC) (Note: The Joint Typhoon Warning Center (JTWC) is a joint United States Navy – United States Air Force task force that issues advisories for storms in the basin.) estimated peak winds of 130 km/h (80 mph). On February 7, Gervaise passed about 130 km (80 mi) southeast of Réunion. The track shifted to the south and southeast over time, steered by a passing cold front. On February 10, Gervaise dissipated within the cold front.

Gervaise first affected St. Brandon, producing wind gusts of over 100 km/h (62 mph), along with heavy rainfall. Cyclone Gervaise killed 10 people during its passage of Mauritius. Its strongest wind gusts occurred after the passage of the eye, peaking at 280 km/h (170 mph) at Mon Desert. Heavy rainfall affected the island for several days, reaching 674 mm (26.5 in) at Grosse Roche. The high winds knocked down power lines, radio transmission with Vacoas for 24 hours, and many crops. About 25% of the island's sugar cane crop was lost. The storm damaged several houses, leaving thousands homeless. The cyclone last affected Réunion, where it produced wind gusts of 180 km/h (110 mph). Gervaise also dropped heavy rainfall on the island, reaching 548 mm (21.6 in) at Plaine des Cafres. It caused substantial damage to properties, vegetation and wildlife. Moored yachts around the coast were washed hundreds of yards inland in places due to the storm surge and in the Mauritian capital Port Louis, a cargo ship of ca. 10,000 tonnes was washed up on to the quay. 34 injured, 3,706 homeless.

=== Tropical Cyclone Helose ===
- Tropical cyclone (MFR)
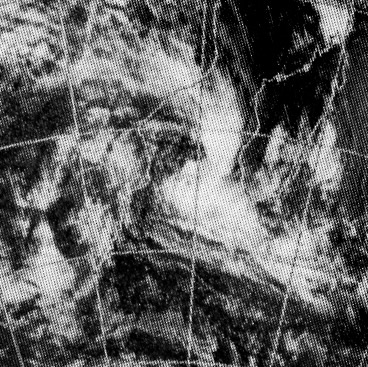
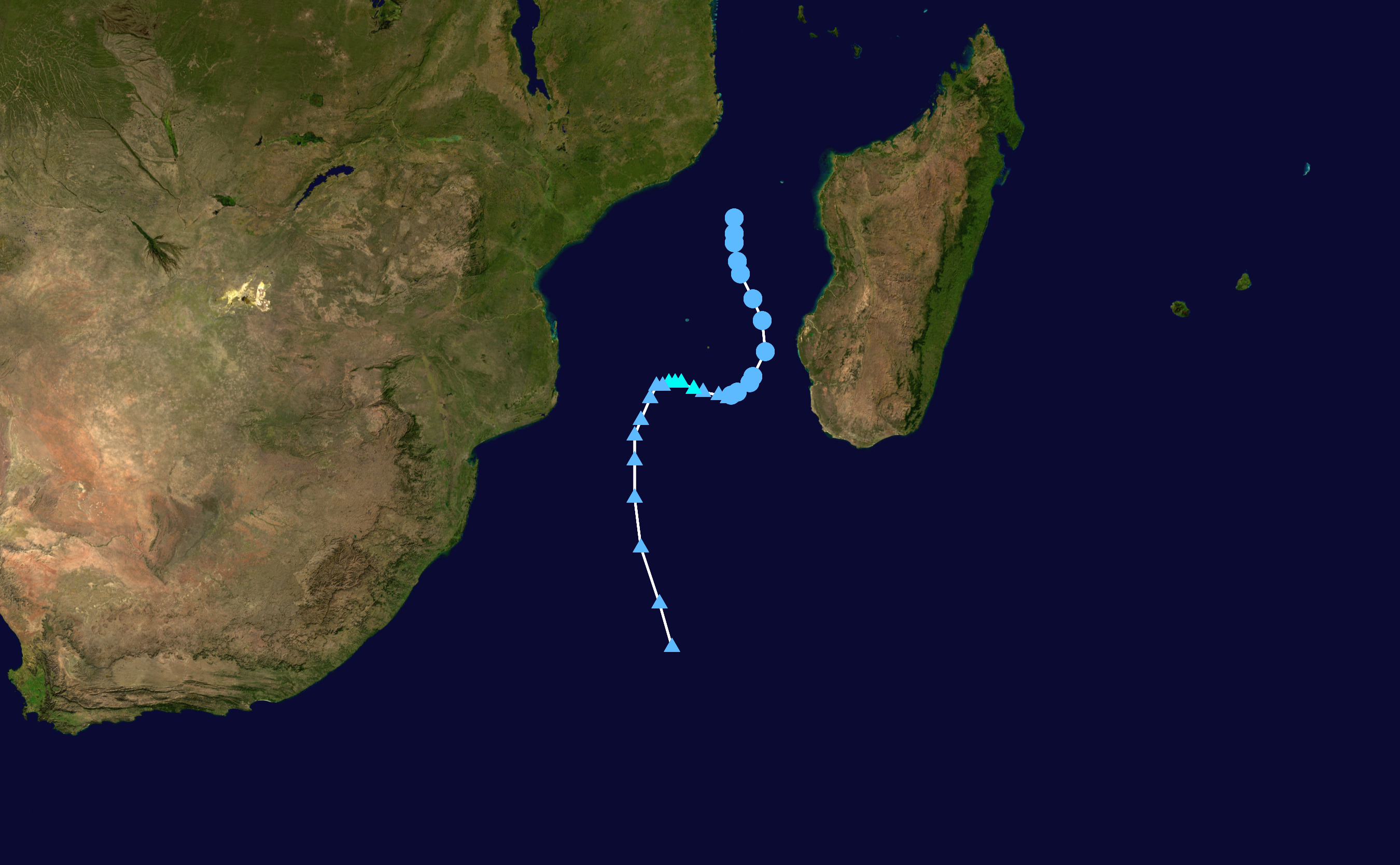
- Duration: February 19 – February 26
- Peak intensity: 150 km/h (90 mph) (10-min); 985 hPa (mbar)

Helose existed from February 19 to February 26.

=== Severe Tropical Storm Ines ===
- Severe tropical storm (MFR)
- Tropical storm (SSHWS)
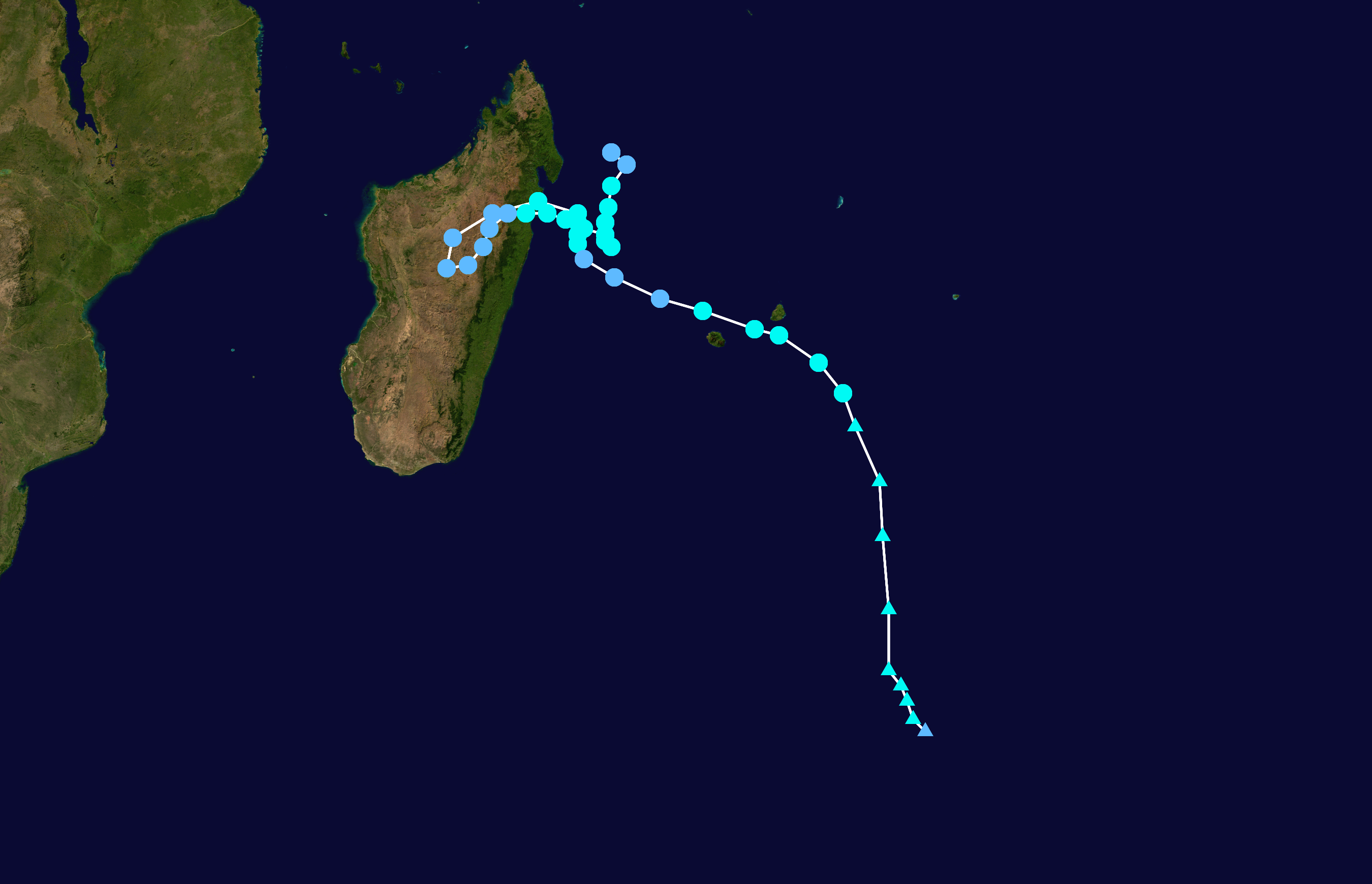
- Duration: March 9 – March 19
- Peak intensity: 110 km/h (70 mph) (10-min); 985 hPa (mbar)

Ines existed from March 9 to March 19.

=== Severe Tropical Storm Junon ===
- Severe tropical storm (MFR)
- Tropical storm (SSHWS)
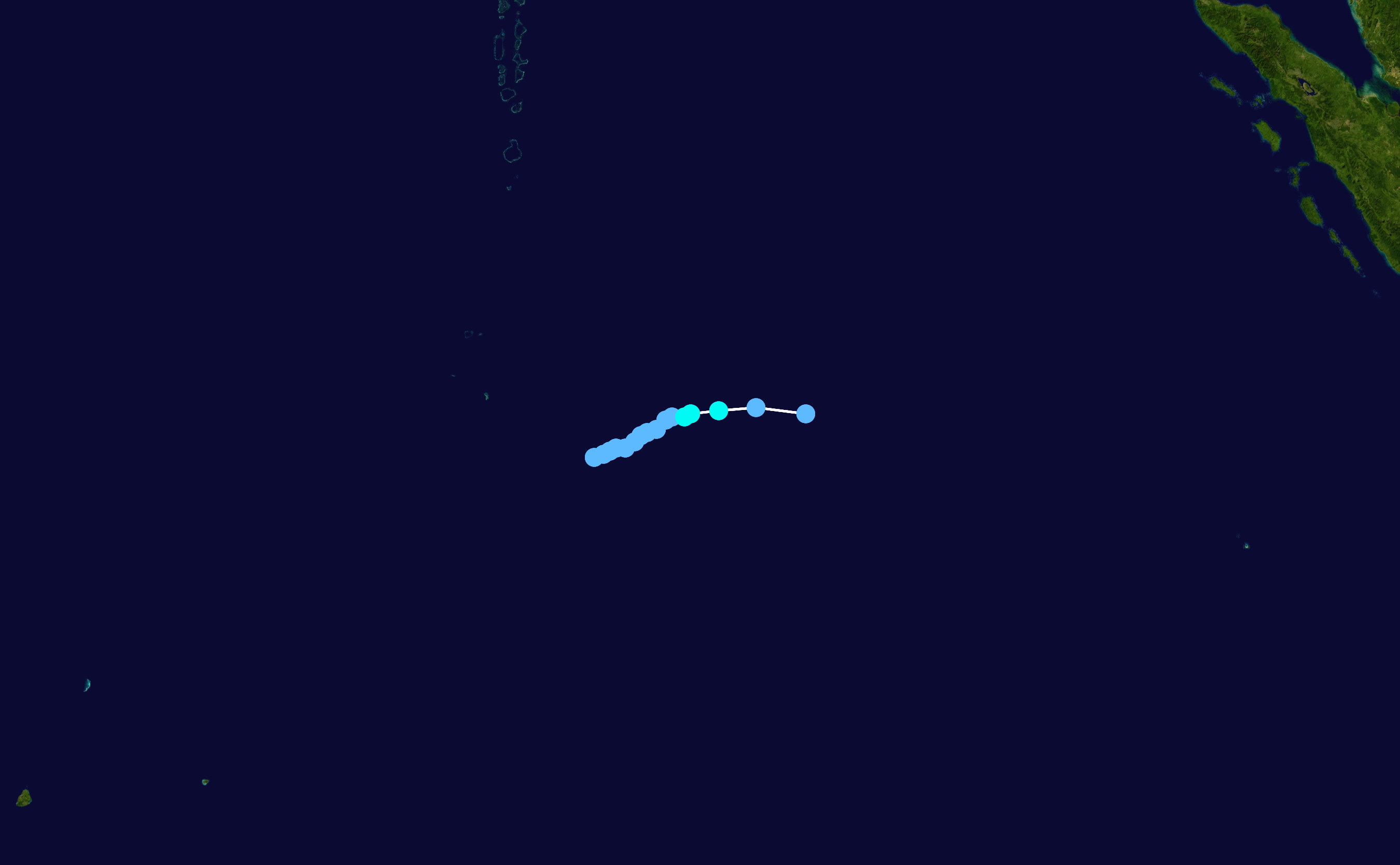
- Duration: April 18 – April 22
- Peak intensity: 95 km/h (60 mph) (10-min); 1005 hPa (mbar)

Junon existed from April 18 to April 22.

== Season effects ==
Name	Dates	Peak intensity			Areas affected	Damage (USD)	Deaths	Ref(s).
Name	Dates	Category	Wind speed	Pressure	Areas affected	Damage (USD)	Deaths	Ref(s).
Norah	November 1 – 4, 1974	Severe tropical storm	95 km/h (60 mph)	988 hPa (29.18 inHg)	Christmas Island, Cocos Island	None	None	
Adele	December 23 – 24, 1974	Tropical disturbance	Not specified	Not specified	Christmas Island, Cocos Island	None	None	
Blandine	January 6 – 12, 1975	Intense tropical cyclone	175 km/h (110 mph)	980 hPa (28.94 inHg)	None	None	None	
Camille	January 10 – 21, 1975	Tropical cyclone	150 km/h (90 mph)	995 hPa (29.38 inHg)	None	None	None	
Robyn–Deborah	January 14 – 24, 1975	Intense tropical cyclone	185 km/h (115 mph)	965 hPa (28.50 inHg)	None	None	None	
Elsa	January 25 – 27, 1975	Tropical depression	55 km/h (35 mph)	Not specified	None	None	None	
Fernande	February 1 – 1, 1975	Tropical disturbance	55 km/h (35 mph)	Not specified	None	None	None	
Gervaise	February 1 – 10, 1975	Intense tropical cyclone	195 km/h (120 mph)	951 hPa (28.08 inHg)	None	None	None	
Helose	February 19 – 26, 1975	Tropical cyclone	150 km/h (90 mph)	985 hPa (29.09 inHg)	None	None	None	
Ines	March 9 – 19, 1975	Severe tropical storm	110 km/h (70 mph)	985 hPa (29.09 inHg)	None	None	None	
Junon	April 18 – 22, 1975	Severe tropical storm	95 km/h (60 mph)	1005 hPa (29.68 inHg)	None	None	None	
Season aggregates
11 systems			195 km/h (120 mph)	951 hPa (28.08 inHg)				

== See also ==
- Atlantic hurricane seasons: 1974, 1975
- Eastern Pacific hurricane seasons: 1974, 1975
- Western Pacific typhoon seasons: 1974, 1975
- North Indian Ocean cyclone seasons: 1974, 1975
