= Cyclone Viyaru =

North Indian Ocean cyclone in 2013

Cyclonic Storm Viyaru
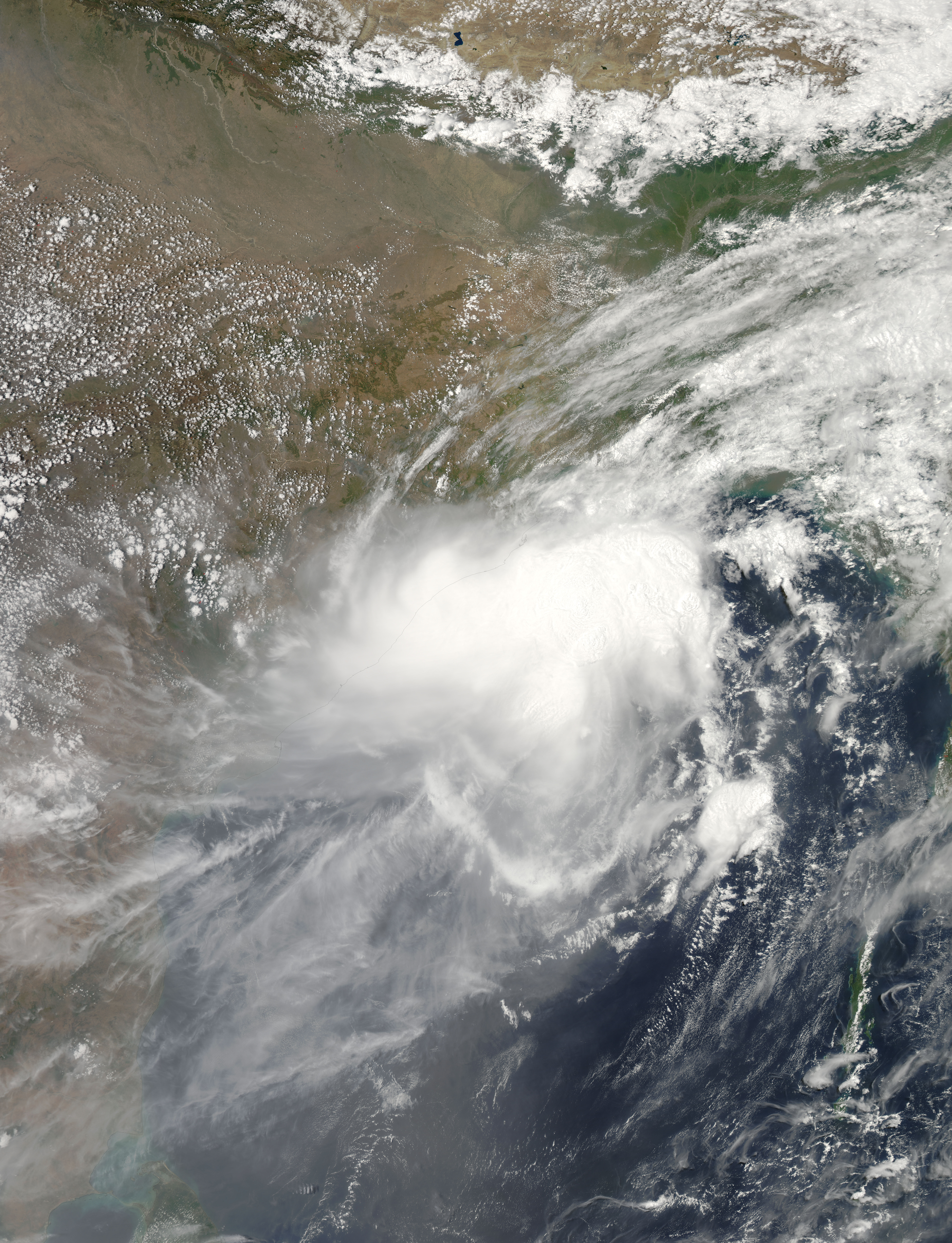
- Cyclone Viyaru at peak intensity, approaching Bangladesh on May 15

Meteorological history
- Formed: May 10, 2013
- Dissipated: May 17, 2013

Cyclonic storm
- 3-minute sustained (IMD)
- Highest winds: 85 km/h (50 mph)
- Lowest pressure: 990 hPa (mbar); 29.23 inHg

Tropical storm
- 1-minute sustained (SSHWS)
- Highest winds: 85 km/h (50 mph)
- Lowest pressure: 989 hPa (mbar); 29.21 inHg

Overall effects
- Fatalities: 107 total
- Missing: 6
- Damage: $250 million (2013 USD)
- Areas affected: Indonesia; Sri Lanka; India; Thailand; Myanmar; Bangladesh
- IBTrACS
- Part of the 2013 North Indian Ocean cyclone season

Cyclonic Storm Viyaru (Note: The name Viyaru (Sinhala: වියරු, [ʋijaru]) was contributed by Sri Lanka and means "agitation, distress" in Sinhala.), operationally known as Cyclonic Storm Mahasen (Note: The name Mahasen (Sinhala: මහසෙන්, [maɦasen]) was contributed by Sri Lanka and refers to King Mahasen in Sinhala.), was a relatively weak tropical cyclone that caused loss of life across six countries in Southern and Southeastern Asia. Originating from an area of low pressure over the southern Bay of Bengal in early May 2013, Viyaru slowly consolidated into a depression on May 10, 2013. The depression gained forward momentum and attained gale-force winds on May 11 and was designated as Cyclonic Storm Viyaru, the first named storm of the season. Owing to adverse atmospheric conditions, the depression struggled to maintain organized convection as it moved closer to eastern India. On May 14, 2013, the exposed circulation of Viyaru turned northeastward. The following day, conditions again allowed for the storm to intensify. Early on May 16, 2013, the cyclone attained its peak intensity with winds of 85 km/h (55 mph) and a barometric pressure of 990 mbar (hPa; 29.23 inHg). (Note: All sustained wind speeds are based on three-minute standards unless otherwise stated.) Shortly thereafter Viyaru made landfall near Chittagong, Bangladesh. On May 17, 2013, it moved over the eastern Indian state of Nagaland.

Early in the storm's existence, it brought flooding rains to much of northwestern Indonesia, resulting in significant damage. At least four people died and six others were reported missing. Offshore, a further 11 people went missing and were feared dead. In preparation for the storm, large-scale evacuations were recommended for parts of Myanmar. This resulted in people overcrowding boats to escape, and one or several vessels capsized, causing at least 39 deaths; 42 people were rescued while 19 others were unaccounted for and feared dead. The storm's expansive cloud mass also brought unsettled weather to Sri Lanka, Thailand, and southeastern India. Severe storms in India and Sri Lanka were responsible for at least 16 fatalities and significant damage; one person died in Thailand. Striking Bangladesh in a weaker state than initially expected, the storm caused moderate to severe damage. A total of 95,003 poorly constructed huts were damaged or destroyed, 17 people died, and nearly 1.3 million were affected across the country. Losses to industry reached $250 million (2013 USD). (Note: All currencies are in their 2013 values and are converted to United States dollars using data from the International Monetary Fund published by the World Bank.) Myanmar was spared damage and further casualties.

Operationally, the storm was referred to as Mahasen; however, this stirred some controversy from nationalists and officials in Sri Lanka. They claimed that the name comes from King Mahasena of Anuradhapura who brought prosperity to the island, thus naming a destructive force of nature after him would be improper. As such, Sri Lankan agencies referred to the system as a nameless cyclone and requested that international agencies do the same. The name had been submitted to be used in the basin by Sri Lanka in 2003. The India Meteorological Department later renamed the system as Viyaru in their final reports and removed Mahasen from all previous archived advisories.

== Meteorological history ==
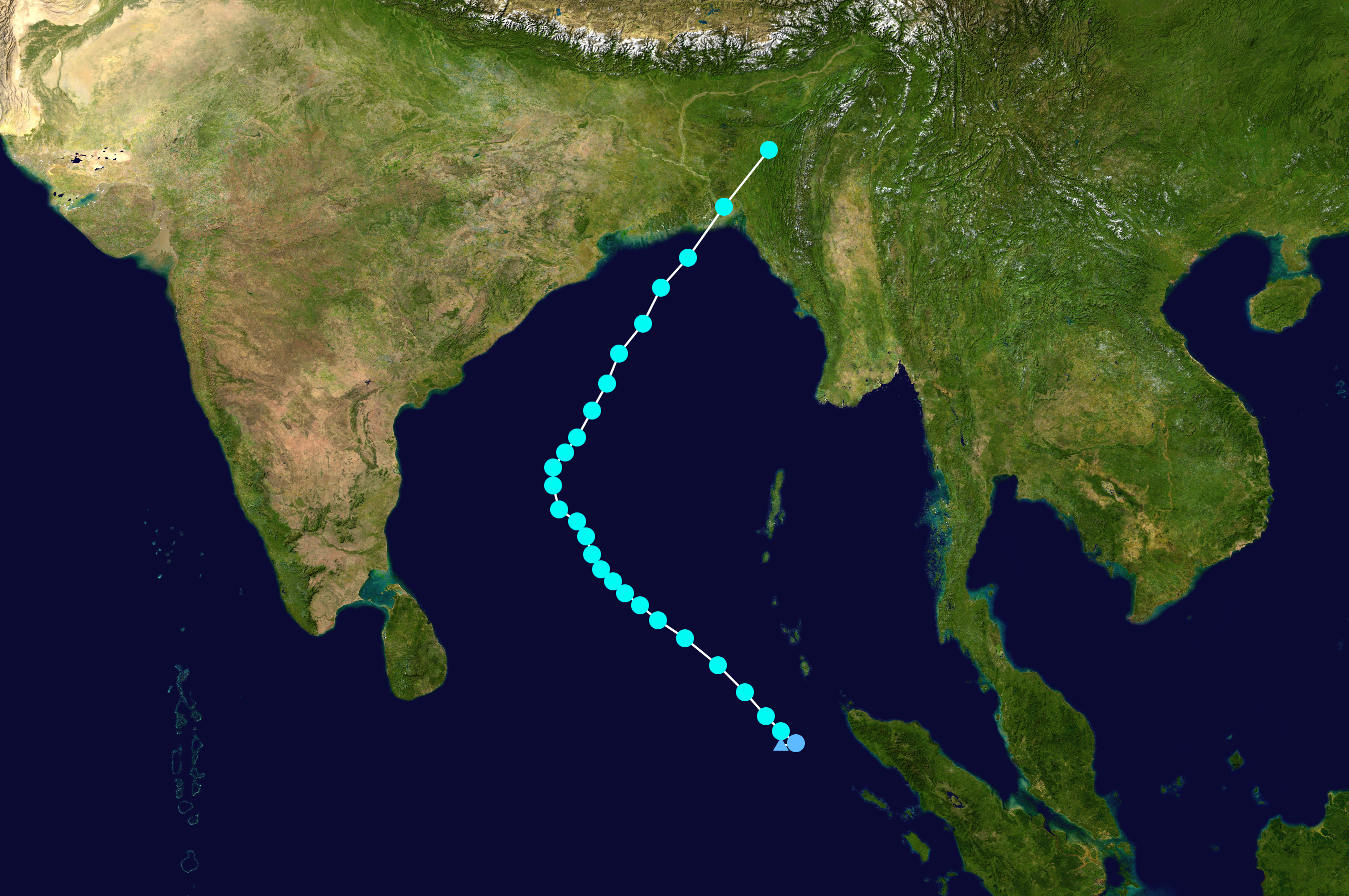
Map plotting the storm's track and intensity, according to the Saffir–Simpson scale Map key Saffir–Simpson scale Tropical depression (≤38 mph, ≤62 km/h) Tropical storm (39–73 mph, 63–118 km/h) Category 1 (74–95 mph, 119–153 km/h) Category 2 (96–110 mph, 154–177 km/h) Category 3 (111–129 mph, 178–208 km/h) Category 4 (130–156 mph, 209–251 km/h) Category 5 (≥157 mph, ≥252 km/h) Unknown Storm type Tropical cyclone Subtropical cyclone Extratropical cyclone, remnant low, tropical disturbance, or monsoon depression

In early May 2013, an area of disturbed weather formed over the southern Bay of Bengal. Remaining nearly stationary, the system gradually developed. By May 8, organized convection formed around a defined low-pressure area, with banding features present. With conditions favoring intensification, low wind shear, excellent poleward outflow, and unusually high sea surface temperatures (estimated at 31 °C (88 °F)), the system was anticipated to become a tropical cyclone over the following days. A pulse in the Madden–Julian oscillation, coupled with a convective Kelvin wave allowed the system, along with its Southern Hemisphere counterpart Tropical Storm Jamala, to further develop. Following additional organization, the Joint Typhoon Warning Center (JTWC) issued a Tropical Cyclone Formation Alert for the low on May 10. (Note: The Joint Typhoon Warning Center is a joint United States Navy – United States Air Force task force that issues tropical cyclone warnings for the western Pacific Ocean and other regions.) Despite an increase in wind shear, causing the low to become dislocated from the deepest convection, the system further intensified and a scatterometer pass from the Oceansat-2 satellite indicated winds up to 65 km/h (40 mph). In light of this data, the JTWC classified the system as Tropical Cyclone 01B while it was situated roughly 1,950 km (1,210 mi) south of Chittagong, Bangladesh. At the time, the agency anticipated significant strengthening of the cyclone, forecasting it to attain winds in excess of 155 km/h (95 mph). The India Meteorological Department (IMD) followed suit hours later, designating the system as Depression BOB 01 and soon upgrading it to a deep depression. (Note: The India Meteorological Department is the official Regional Specialized Meteorological Center for the northern Indian Ocean.)

Viyaru (top) as a depression off the coast of Sumatra, along with Moderate Tropical Storm Jamala to its south, on May 10

Situated to the south of a subtropical ridge, the storm tracked west-northwestward to northwestward. Early on May 11, the IMD upgraded the system to a cyclonic storm and assigned it the name Mahasen. Deep convection, with cloud tops estimated as cold as −85 °C (−121 °F) developed near the storm's center. Despite moderate to strong wind shear, Viyaru's prominent outflow offset the negative influence of the shear, allowing a central dense overcast to form. Later that day, the cyclone's motion matched that of the shear, further decreasing the effects of it. This allowed Viyaru to intensify, with the JTWC estimating one-minute sustained winds reaching 95 km/h (60 mph). By May 12, the central dense overcast broke apart into fragmented banding features that wrapped into the center. Dry air soon began to flow into the circulation, disrupting convection and causing the low to relocate eastward and become partially exposed. Later that day, the system began turning northward as it approached the western edge of the subtropical ridge. By this time, the circulation had become broad and ill-defined, indicating that the storm weakened.

On May 13, steering currents weakened around the cyclone due to a shortwave trough over India, causing Viyaru to slowly move northwestward. Wind shear also increased once again as the outflow degraded. By May 14, the exposed and elongated circulation of Viyaru turned northeastward as the ridge became more pronounced. The majority of convection remained sheared to the west, though upper-level conditions were anticipated to become somewhat favorable for restrengthening. As the system approached Bangladesh, a large area convection and rebuilt over the center. Slight strengthening took place on May 15, with the IMD reporting winds reaching 85 km/h (55 mph). Viyaru also began to accelerate somewhat as a trough became established to the west. Early on May 16, the system attained its peak intensity with a barometric pressure estimated at 990 mbar (hPa; 29.23 inHg). Around 0800 UTC (1330 IST), Viyaru made landfall in Bangladesh between Feni and Chittagong. Within hours of moving ashore, rapid weakening ensued as the circulation deteriorated and convection became shallow. In light of this, the JTWC issued their final advisory on the cyclone. The IMD downgraded Viyaru to a deep depression shortly after as it moved over Mizoram, India. The system further degraded as it moved over mountainous terrain and was last noted as a well-marked area of low pressure over Nagaland on May 17.

== Preparations and impact ==
=== Indonesia ===
Early in the storm's life, it affected parts of northwestern Indonesia. In Aceh, five days of heavy rain triggered flash flooding that forced thousands to evacuate. One person died in Simeulue Regency after being struck by a fallen tree and another went missing offshore when his motorboat sank. Twenty-two fishermen were reported missing on May 9 after sailing into the storm; however, ten were soon rescued. Another was found in a nearby town by May 18 while the remaining eleven were feared dead. Much of Aceh experienced torrential rains and flooding occurred in six districts. In some places, waters reached depths of 2.5 m (8.2 ft). Approximately 30,000 people were affected by the floods. Near the border of Aceh and North Sumatra, a landslide struck a bus with eight people in it and sent it into the nearby Laekombi Lake. Three bodies were recovered 5 km (3.1 mi) away from where the accident took place while the other five remained missing.

=== Sri Lanka ===
Heavy rains from the cyclone's outer bands caused significant flooding in Sri Lanka. As much as 146.3 mm (5.76 in) of precipitation fell in Ratnapura while 113 mm (4.4 in) was reported in Kurunegala. Water flows on the island's rivers reached 106 million cubic meters; however, hydroelectric dams constructed on the rivers prevented this flow from flooding areas downstream. Instead, this water served to raise the electricity storage from 661.5 to 794.4 GWh (2,381 to 2,860 TJ), 52.6 to 63.1 percent of capacity. At least eight people died while two to three others were reported missing. A total of 7,339 people were affected by the storm, of which 3,861 were rendered homeless.

=== India ===
Farther west, severe storms in Andhra Pradesh, India caused eight deaths and injured four others; all of the casualties were the result of lightning. Heavy rains from the storms also flooded 739 hectares (1,800 acres) of crops and drowned 23 livestock. The system also brought a hot airmass to parts of southeastern India, with Chennai recording temperatures as high as 39.6 °C (103.3 °F). On May 13, coastal districts of Odisha were placed on alert for heavy rains and gusty winds associated with the passage of the cyclone. Across the state, the storm brought scattered strong storms, producing winds up to 72 km/h (45 mph) in Balasore, and much needed relief to an ongoing heat wave. The heaviest rains fell in Malkangiri where 48 mm (1.9 in) was measured. Western parts of the state experienced a significant drop in temperatures after reaching 46 °C (115 °F) prior to the cyclone. Schools in Manipur and Mizoram had a half day on May 16 and remained closed the following day. The Government of Assam was also on alert for possible effects from the storm.

=== Thailand ===
Large swells and high winds extending from the storm impacted the west coast of Thailand. Storms associated with the cyclone also caused significant damage in Nakhon Sawan Province, resulting in one death. Three homes were destroyed and twenty others were damaged in the province.

=== Bangladesh ===
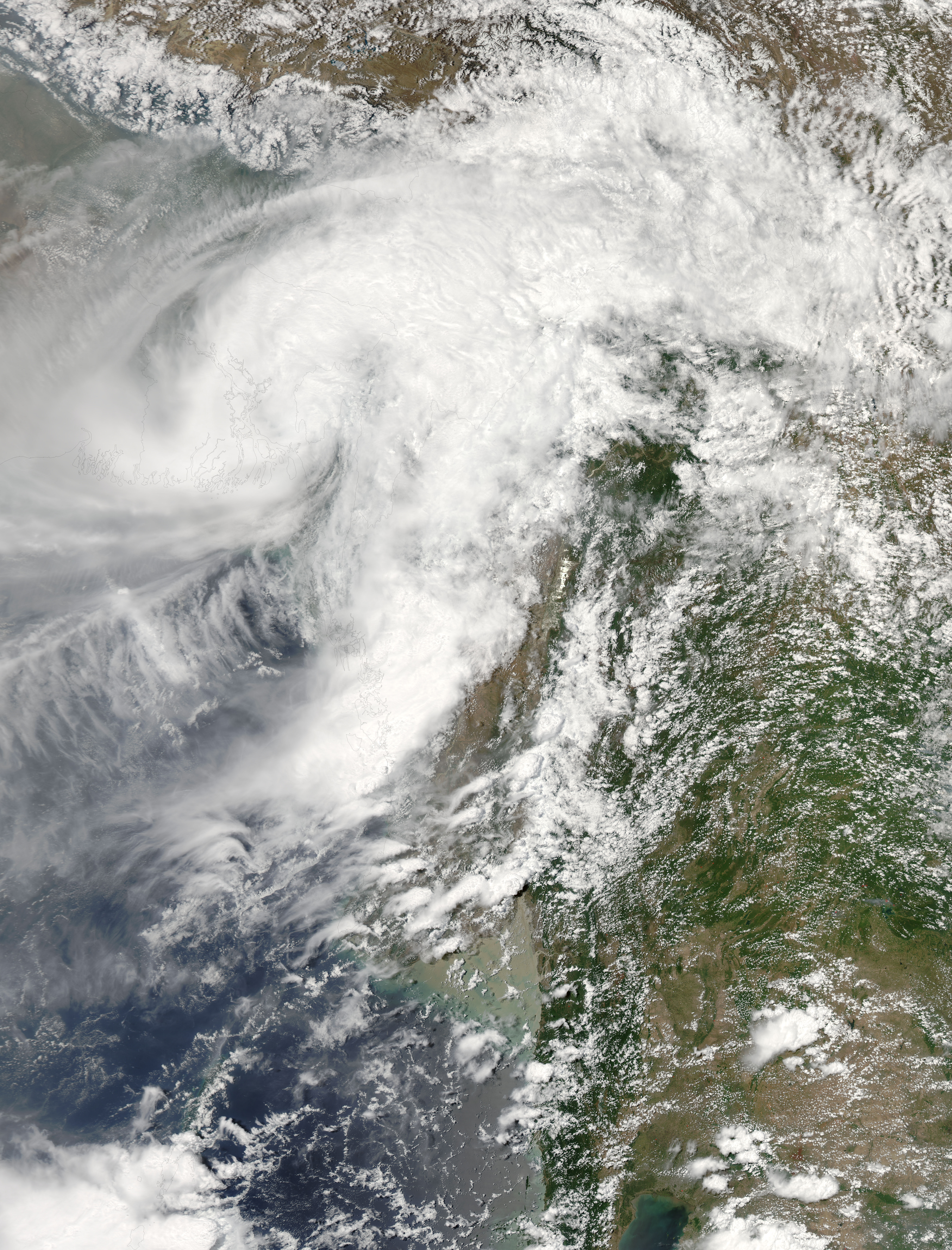
Viyaru making landfall in Feni, Bangladesh on May 16

On May 13, the Government of Bangladesh raised the nation's storm alert to level seven (on a ten-level scale). Resources towards food stockpiles were allocated, with plans for 100 metric tons (98 long tons; 110 short tons) of rice to be prepared. All public buildings and some private, such as hotels, were to be treated as evacuation centers. The Bangladeshi armed forces and air force were placed on stand-by for rescue and relief missions following the storm. By May 15, 3,770 shelters were opened to house evacuees across the country. The nation's disaster management agency also allocated ৳300,000 (US$3,800) in funds, 5,000 tents, and 7,000 sari and lungi. Roughly 50,000 volunteers were placed on alert. The country's second-largest city, Chittagong, was brought to a stand-still and airports were shut down. Approximately 1 million people sought refuge in shelters, roughly 600,000 of whom lived around Chittagong. There were also concerns over the safety of 230,000 Rohingyan refugees (following Myanmar's deadly riots in 2012) who do not have sufficient shelter.

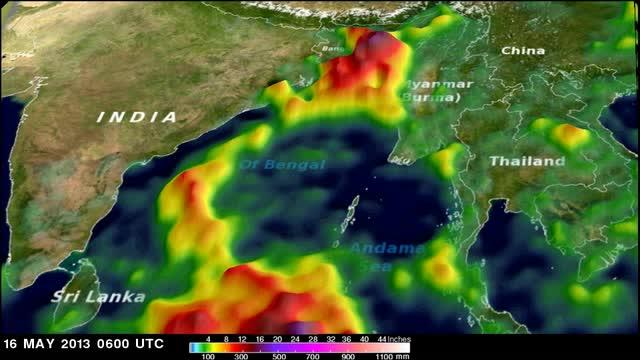
Satellite-estimated rainfall totals across the Bay of Bengal from May 6 to 16 derived from NASA's Tropical Rainfall Measuring Mission. Areas in purple, seen along the Bangladesh–Myanmar border, indicate amounts in excess of 500 mm (20 in); the highest estimated value was 544 mm (21.4 in). (Note: The 544 mm (21.4 in) total includes heavy rains that fell over the region in advance of the cyclone.)

On May 16, Viyaru struck southern Bangladesh, bringing heavy rains and winds up to 95 km/h (60 mph). Though the storm was weaker than anticipated, rains over the country preceding the cyclone led to concerns of widespread flooding. In some areas, more than a month's worth of rain fell over two weeks. Rains amounted to 253 mm (10.0 in) in parts of the Patuakhali District while 76 mm (3.0 in) of rain fell in Chittagong during Viyaru's passage. Low-lying coastal areas were flooded by a 1 m (3 ft 3 in) storm surge; however, low tide lessened the impact of the surge. Damage in these regions was less than initially feared. Tidal flooding affected 70 villages in the Cox's Bazar District. Along the Meghna River, 30 villages became submerged in flood waters. Government assessments revealed that 49,178 homes were totally destroyed while another 45,825 were damaged. Tens of thousands of trees were downed, causing travel disruptions. At least 17 people were killed across the country, all of whom were in the southwestern coastal areas. Thousands of people were also injured and many livestock were killed. The most severe damage and greatest loss of life took place in the Barguna District. Approximately 15,000 mud-built homes sustained damage in the Noakhali district. In the Patuakhali District, at least 100 huts were destroyed. Severe damage to agriculture also took place, with many standing crops flattened by gale-force winds. Roughly 128,000 hectares (316,300 acres) of crops in Patuakhali were damaged, roughly half of which was for sweet potato. Industrial losses in the country amounted to ৳20 billion (US$250 million). A total of 1,285,508 people were affected by the storm throughout the country. The relatively low death toll was seen as a great success of Bangladesh's disaster preparedness, with the International Organization for Migration stating, "if this same storm had hit 20 years ago, we might have seen thousands of deaths."

Relief efforts began shortly after the storm's passage. The Bangladeshi government allocated US$13 million and 5,000 tonnes (4,900 long tons; 5,500 short tons) of rice for victims. Families in remote areas were provided with ৳3,000 (US$38) and 20 kg (44 lb) of rice. The disaster management agency mobilized 100 water treatment facilities. Aerial assessments of damage revealed only localized areas of significant impact. No disaster declaration was made in the storm's wake and the government did not request international assistance. On May 17, Christian Aid released £100,000 (US$153,700) in emergency funds to partner organizations working in Bangladesh. The following day, the International Federation of Red Cross and Red Crescent Societies began a three-month relief operation to provide assistance to 20,000 people in the hard-hit districts of Patuakhali, Barguna, and Bhola.

=== Myanmar ===
In Myanmar, the United Nations urged that approximately 70,000 people evacuate in preparation for the cyclone. This prompted widespread evacuations in the country. Off the coast of Rakhine State, a large boat was towing two smaller ones to a safer area, late on May 13, when one or more of them capsized after striking rocks. Authorities believed there were 100-150 people total aboard the three vessels. By the following day, 42 people had been rescued and 8 bodies had been found. On May 16, members of the Bangladeshi border guard recovered 31 bodies in Teknaf Upazila from those who drowned in the accident. By May 14, the government planned to have 38,000 people evacuated; however, this process was reportedly moving slower than expected. With the majority of evacuees being internally displaced persons, many were hesitant to listen to orders from the military, and some refused to leave their temporary shelters. By May 15, the number of displaced persons urged to evacuate rose to 140,000, with many still refusing to leave. Some told reporters that they would not listen to anything the government said unless they pointed guns at them. In Arakan State, just outside Sittwe, 393 people were evacuated from low-lying areas. Field offices of the Save the Children foundation were placed on high alert. Sessions on how to prepare for cyclones were held across Rakhine State. Ultimately, nearly 70,000 people were evacuated in Rakhine State prior to Viyaru's arrival.

Because the storm took a more westerly track than anticipated, Myanmar was spared much impact from the cyclone. The storm's effects were limited to some rain and waves in northwestern areas, with 2 m (6.6 ft) waves reported in Maungdaw Township. In Sittwe, Mercy Malaysia mobile clinics reported that 90 people sought treatment. Had the storm maintained a more easterly track, officials believed that the Rohingyan people's refusal to evacuate would have resulted in many deaths.

== See also ==
- Tropical cyclones in 2013
- Weather of 2013
