= Cyclone Felleng =

South-West Indian tropical cyclone in 2013

Intense Tropical Cyclone Felleng
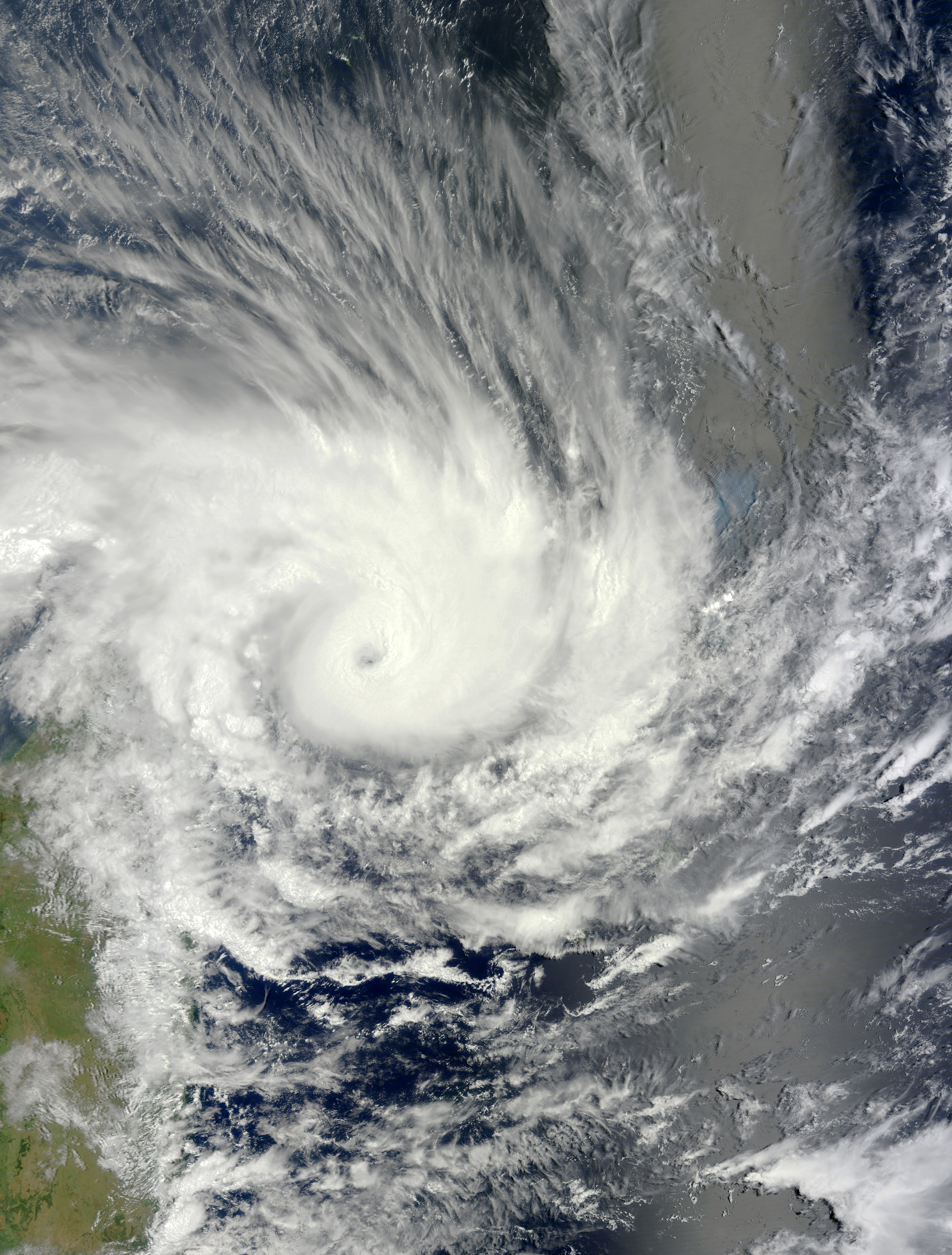
- Intense Tropical Cyclone Felleng on 30 January 2013

Meteorological history
- Formed: 25 January 2013
- Dissipated: 3 February 2013

Intense tropical cyclone
- 10-minute sustained (MFR)
- Highest winds: 175 km/h (110 mph)
- Lowest pressure: 935 hPa (mbar); 27.61 inHg

Category 4-equivalent tropical cyclone
- 1-minute sustained (SSHWS/JTWC)
- Highest winds: 215 km/h (130 mph)
- Lowest pressure: 937 hPa (mbar); 27.67 inHg

Overall effects
- Fatalities: 18
- Damage: >$10 million (2013 USD)
- Areas affected: Seychelles, Madagascar, and Réunion
- Part of the 2012–13 South-West Indian Ocean cyclone season

Intense Tropical Cyclone Felleng was a powerful tropical cyclone that caused destruction across Seychelles, Madagascar, and Réunion. The seventh Tropical Disturbance, sixth named storm, and the third Intense Tropical Cyclone of the 2012–13 South-West Indian Ocean cyclone season, Felleng originated from an area of atmospheric convection embedded in the Intertropical Convergence Zone.

In total, Felleng caused 18 fatalities and above US$10 million in damages.

== Meteorological history ==
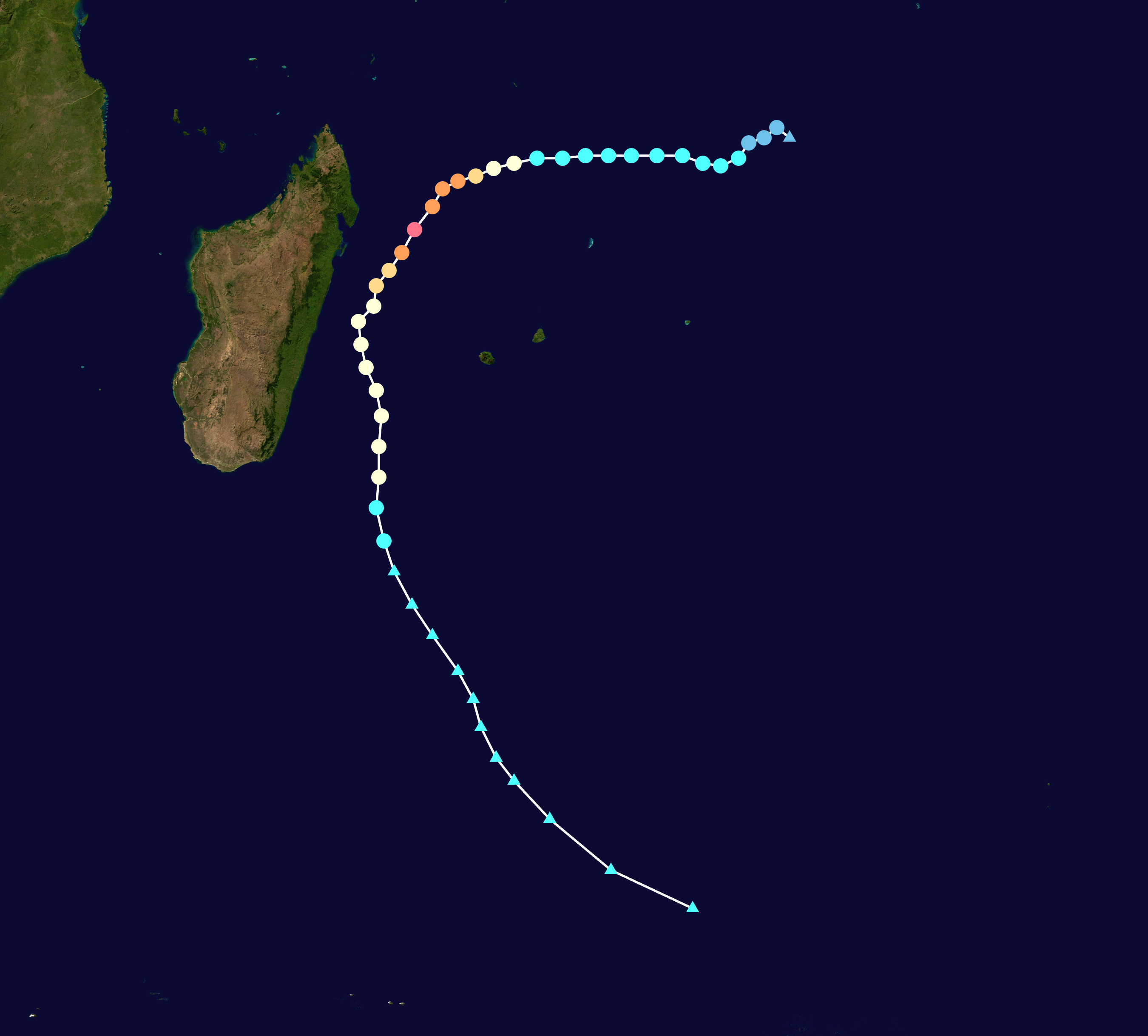
Map plotting the storm's track and intensity, according to the Saffir–Simpson scale Map key Saffir–Simpson scale Tropical depression (≤38 mph, ≤62 km/h) Tropical storm (39–73 mph, 63–118 km/h) Category 1 (74–95 mph, 119–153 km/h) Category 2 (96–110 mph, 154–177 km/h) Category 3 (111–129 mph, 178–208 km/h) Category 4 (130–156 mph, 209–251 km/h) Category 5 (≥157 mph, ≥252 km/h) Unknown Storm type Tropical cyclone Subtropical cyclone Extratropical cyclone, remnant low, tropical disturbance, or monsoon depression

After the Madden–Julian oscillation left its suppressive phase in the South-West Indian Ocean, a low-pressure area embedded in the Intertropical Convergence Zone was noted by Météo-France La Réunion (MFR) on 24 January. Convection was mainly active in the northeast portion of the system, with winds reaching 45 km/h (30 mph) in some places. The system's low-level circulation was poorly defined by 25 January, with the system as a whole being negatively affected by wind shear. At 18:00 Coordinated Universal Time (UTC), MFR upgraded the system to Tropical Disturbance 7, with the Joint Typhoon Warning Center (JTWC) upgrading it to a tropical depression at the same time, assigning it the designation 13S. A small central dense overcast formed as gale-force winds appeared in system's western half, and on 26 January at 06:00 UTC, MFR upgraded Tropical Disturbance 7 to a tropical depression. Weakening wind shear allowed convection to further organize; however, it decayed later in the day, partially exposing the system's low-level circulation. By 12:00 UTC, the JTWC upgraded 7 to a tropical storm. The system's structure improved from its previous sheared pattern, and by 28 January, the MFR upgraded the system to a moderate tropical storm, assigning it the name Felleng.

Felleng improved over the next few hours, consolidating its low-level circulation as its wind field became more symmetrical. Steadily intensifying, it reached Intense Tropical Cyclone strength on 30 January while developing a well-defined eye, with a deep, intense ring of convective banding forming in the eyewall. On 31 January the eye became less well defined, and started to collapse. On 1 February the system started to become elongated, and weakened into a severe tropical storm as it began its extratropical transition. By 3 February, Felleng became fully extratropical, with the low level circulation center becoming totally exposed and elongated, under vertical wind shear, located to the west of the remnant convection.

== Impact ==
=== Seychelles ===
Cyclone Felleng devastated the islands of Mahe, Praslin, and La Digue as a depression, many types of buildings were damaged and many farms were wiped out. Around 1,000 families were affected by floods and landslides, 246 of them were registered as displaced after their homes were damaged or destroyed. Damages from Felleng reached US$8.4 million in the country.

=== Madagascar ===
Cyclone Felleng brought heavy rain to Madagascar, due to which floodwaters rose rapidly in the capital Antananarivo, flooding many low-lying homes, as well as several hundred hectares of rice fields. Government authorities confirmed at least 800 people have been affected by the floods in the capital. Across the island, 9 people were killed and 1,303 were left homeless. A total of 162 homes were destroyed while another 1,803 were damaged by floodwaters, most of which were in Vatovavy-Fitovinany.

=== Réunion ===
Cyclone Felleng's heavy rain and strong winds caused damage in Réunion Island, where 11,200 homes were left without power. Over the course of 72-hours, up to 800 mm (31 in) of rain fell in parts of the island, resulting in significant flooding. In Plaine des Cafres, 512 mm (20.2 in) fell within 24‑hours.

== See also ==
- Cyclone Dumazile
- Tropical Storm Eliakim
- Tropical cyclones in 2013
