= 2012–13 South-West Indian Ocean cyclone season =

Cyclone season in the Southwest Indian Ocean

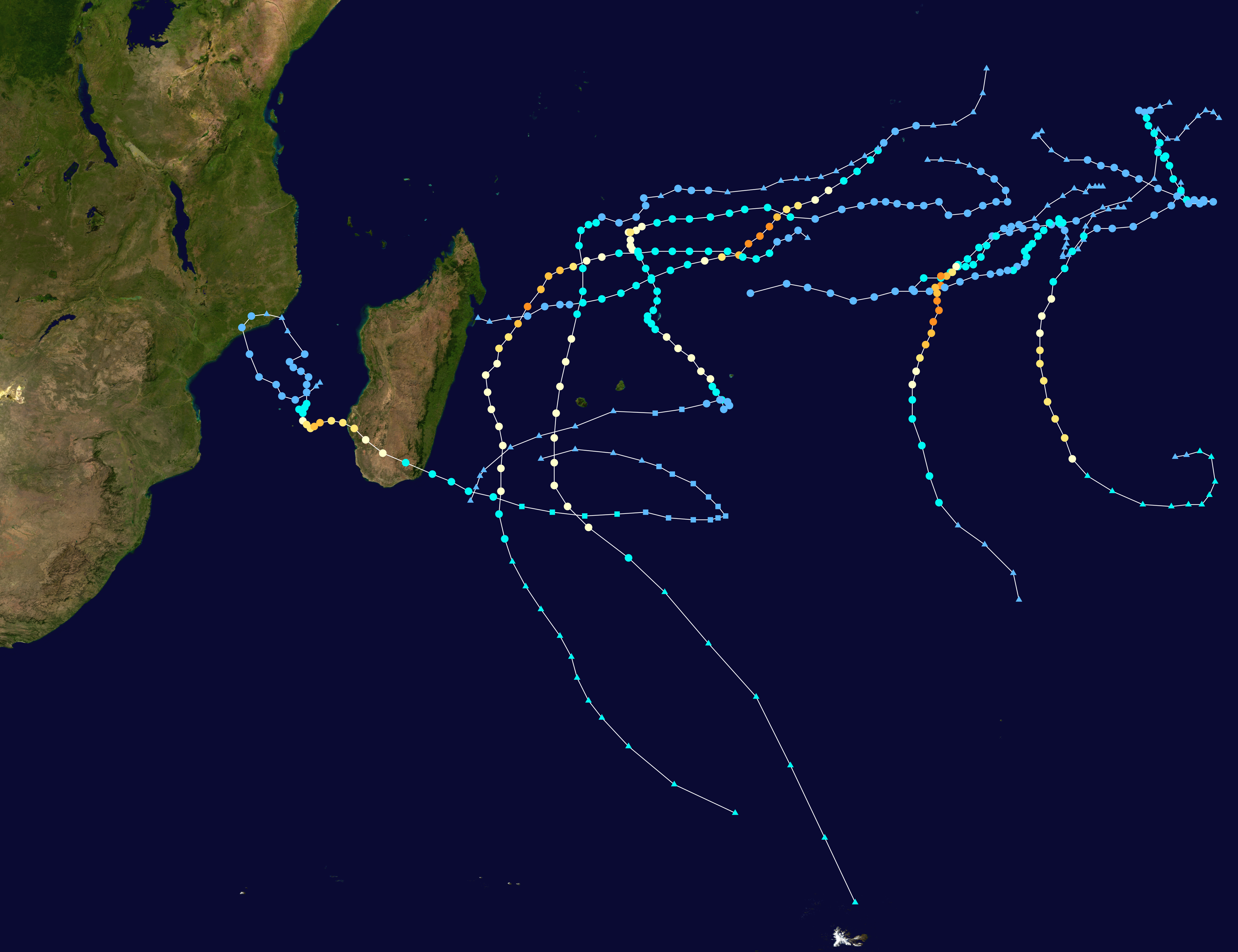
- Season summary map

Seasonal boundaries
- First system formed: October 12, 2012
- Last system dissipated: May 11, 2013

Strongest storm
- By maximum sustained winds: Anais
  - Maximum winds: 185 km/h (115 mph) (10-minute sustained)
  - Lowest pressure: 945 hPa (mbar)
- By central pressure: Felleng
  - Maximum winds: 165 km/h (105 mph) (10-minute sustained)
  - Lowest pressure: 935 hPa (mbar)

Seasonal statistics
- Total disturbances: 11
- Total depressions: 10
- Total storms: 10
- Tropical cyclones: 7
- Intense tropical cyclones: 3
- Total fatalities: 35 total
- Total damage: ~ $46 million (2013 USD)

Related articles
- 2012–13 Australian region cyclone season; 2012–13 South Pacific cyclone season

The 2012–13 South-West Indian Ocean cyclone season was a slightly above average event in tropical cyclone formation in the Southern hemisphere tropical cyclone year starting on July 1, 2012, and ending on June 30, 2013. Within this basin, tropical and subtropical disturbances are officially monitored by the Regional Specialised Meteorological Centre on Réunion island, while the Mauritius and Madagascar weather services assign names to significant tropical and subtropical disturbances. The first tropical disturbance of the season developed on October 12 and rapidly developed into the earliest known intense tropical cyclone on record during October 14.

== Seasonal summary ==
The first tropical disturbance of the season developed on October 12 and gradually intensified to become the earliest known intense tropical cyclone on record on October 14.

== Systems ==
=== Intense Tropical Cyclone Anais ===
- Intense tropical cyclone (MFR)
- Category 4 tropical cyclone (SSHWS)
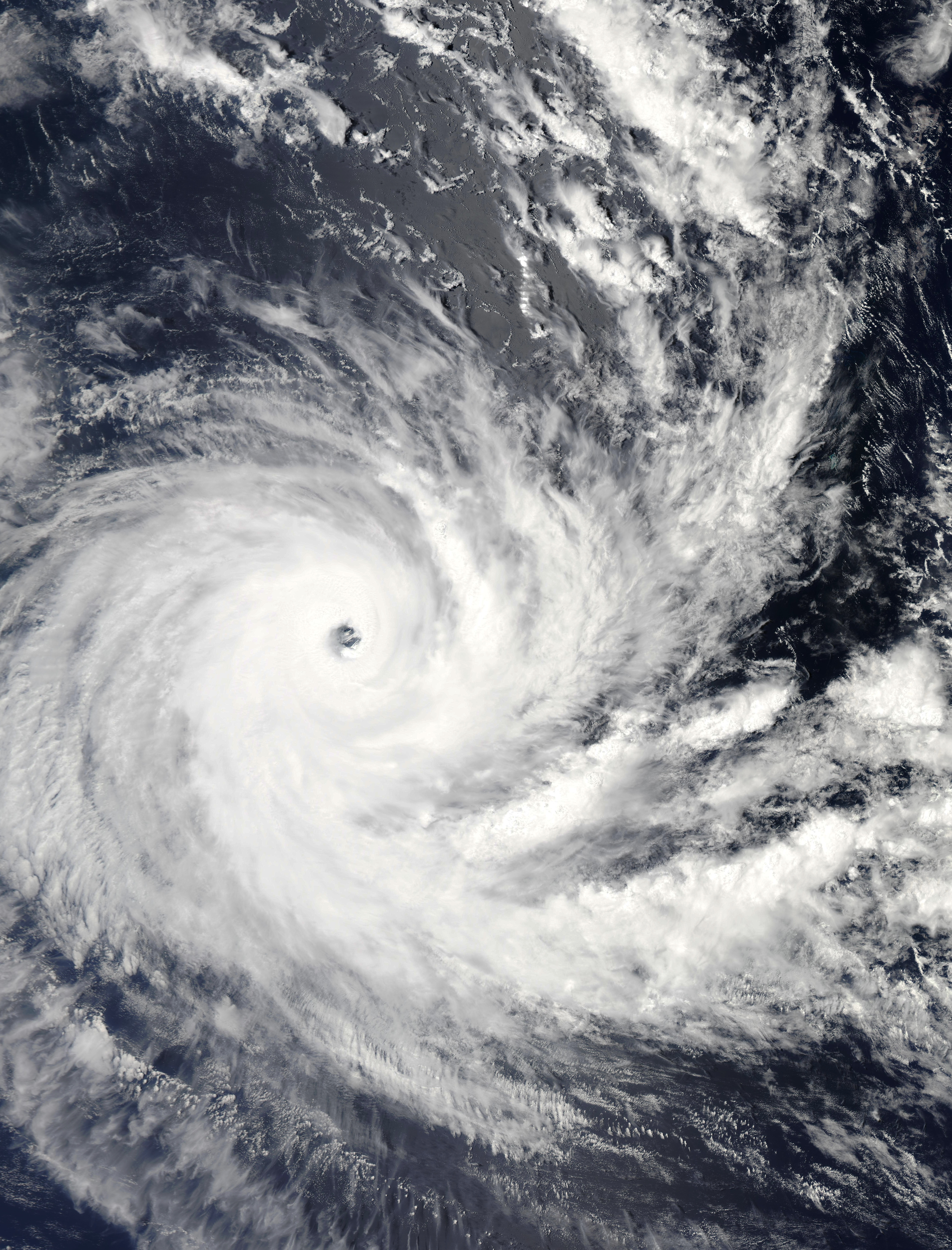
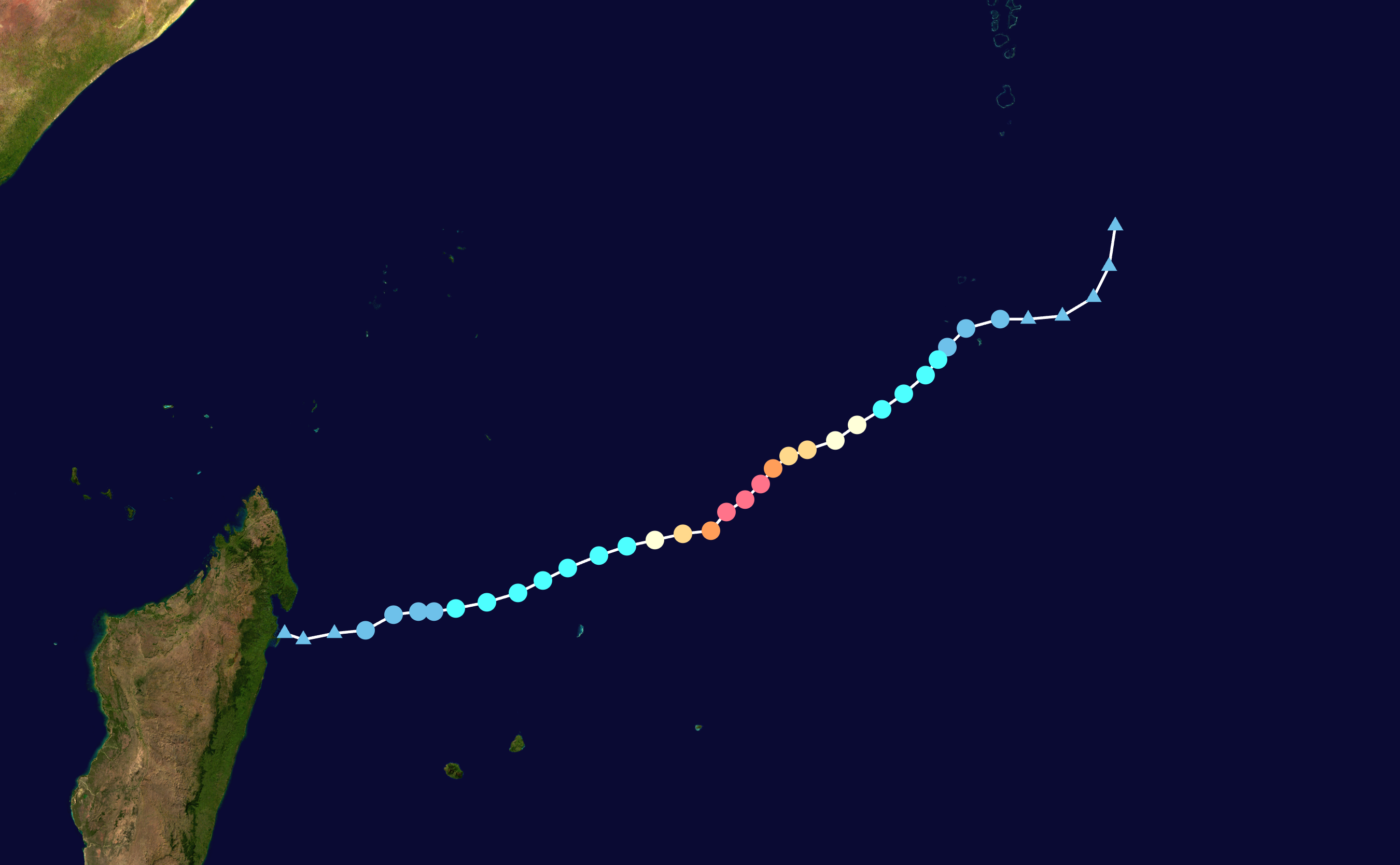
- Duration: October 12 – October 19
- Peak intensity: 185 km/h (115 mph) (10-min); 945 hPa (mbar)

On October 12, 2012, the JTWC issued a Tropical Cyclone Formation Alert (TCFA) on a system near the Chagos Islands. Soon afterwards, RSMC La Réunion designated the system as a tropical disturbance while located roughly 70 nautical miles (130 km) to the west of Diego Garcia. That afternoon, the JTWC upgraded the system into a tropical depression, giving it the designation 01S. The next day, RSMC La Réunion reported that the system had intensified into a moderate tropical storm and named it Anais. As the day progressed, Anais began a period of quick intensification—being upgraded into a tropical cyclone by RSMC La Réunion and a category one tropical cyclone by the JTWC. Anais continued to gradually intensify and was upgraded into an intense tropical cyclone by RSMC La Réunion early on October 14, while it was upgraded to a category 3 cyclone by the JTWC, as it started to form a well defined eye. Late on October 15, as it started to weaken, the system's eye started to collapse, but deep convection remained over the low level circulation center, and it was downgraded to a category 1 cyclone by October 16. On October 17, the system weakened into a tropical storm, and the low-level circulation center became totally exposed, with convection being displaced to the south due to moderate vertical wind shear from the north west. As the day progressed, Anais weakened into a tropical depression. On October 19, the remnants of Anais made landfall over Madagascar associated with a few burst of thunderstorms, before dissipating completely.

On October 14, Anais became the earliest intense tropical cyclone in the South-West Indian Ocean.

=== Tropical Disturbance 02 ===
- Tropical disturbance (MFR)
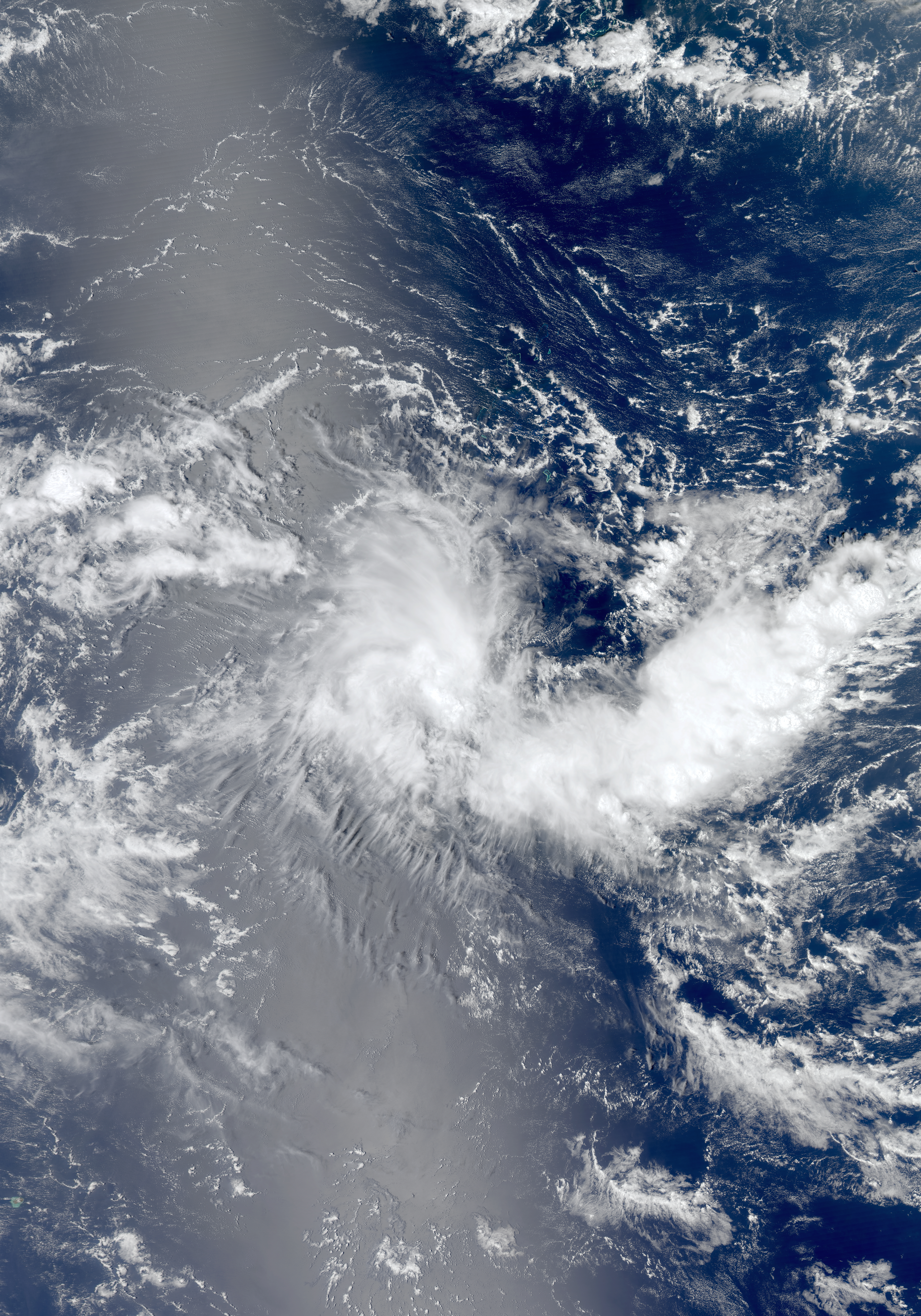
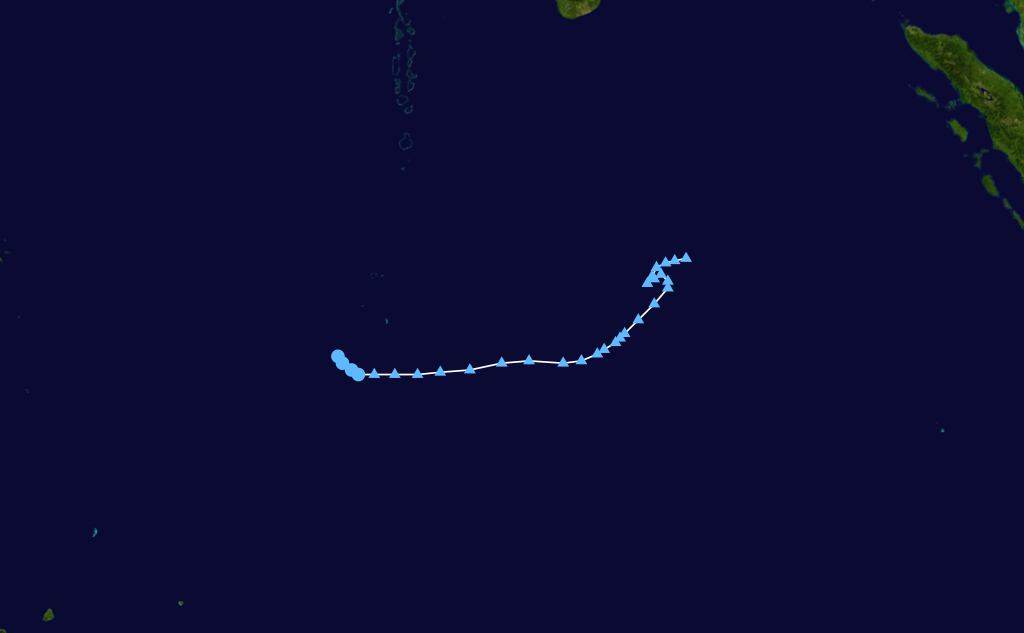
- Duration: November 15 – November 16
- Peak intensity: 45 km/h (30 mph) (10-min); 1004 hPa (mbar)

On November 8, an area of low pressure formed far northeast of La Réunion. It gradually drifted west and developed a low-level circulation center (LLCC). On the next day, isolated convection developed around the system with fragmented spiral banding. The low drifted southwest and slightly weakened on November 12. The low-pressure area soon became disorganized and the JTWC stopped tracking it later that day. Early on November 15, the disturbance regained strength and the convective banding around its LLCC improved and JTWC resumed tracking the system. At the same time, RSMC La Réunion upgraded the low-pressure area to a tropical disturbance. The next day, the system lost most of its convection and Météo France stopped tracking the disturbance, reporting that their forecast models showed no chance of the system restrengthening.

=== Severe Tropical Storm Boldwin ===
- Severe tropical storm (MFR)
- Tropical storm (SSHWS)
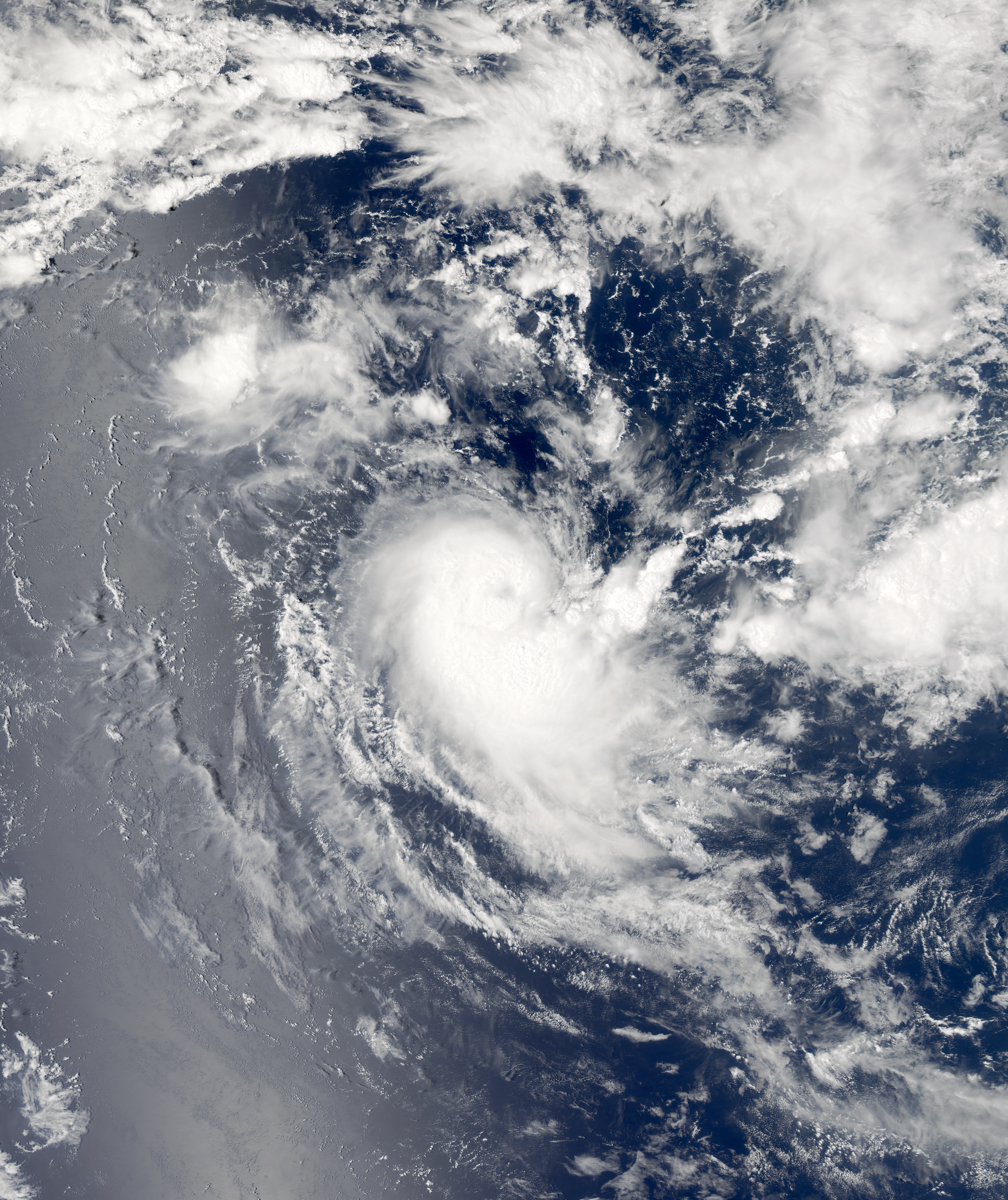
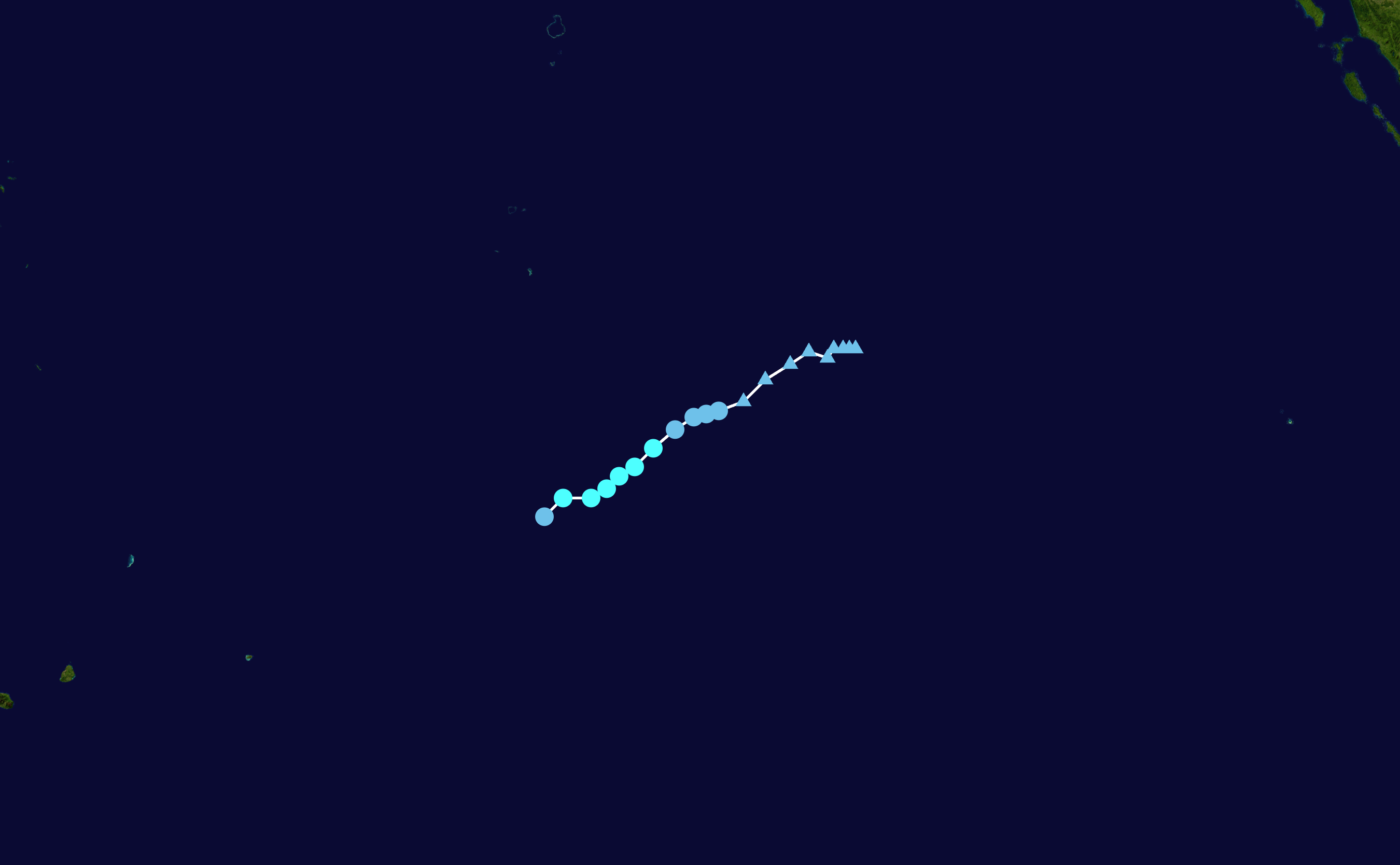
- Duration: November 23 – November 26
- Peak intensity: 105 km/h (65 mph) (10-min); 985 hPa (mbar)

On November 13, a cluster of thunderstorms formed off Western Sumatra. Over the next couple of days, the cluster developed a circulation center, and became a tropical disturbance, being dubbed Invest 96S by the JTWC. Over the next couple of days, unfavorable conditions haltered the development of the system. On November 23, the system organized under moderate vertical wind shear, and the Météo-France started to track the system as a tropical disturbance By midnight, that day, Météo-France further upgraded the system to a tropical depression. In the early hours of November 24, RSMC La Réunion further upgraded the tropical depression into a Moderate Tropical Storm with Mauritius assigning it the name Boldwin. Later the same day, the JTWC also started tracking the system as Tropical Cyclone 02S with winds equivalent to a tropical storm on the SSHS, while it developed an eye-like feature. During the afternoon, Météo-France further upgraded Boldwin into a Severe Tropical Storm with 10-minute sustained winds reaching 100 km/h (60 mph). On November 25, the storm encountered strong vertical wind shear and much of its convection got displaced to the southeast, partially exposing the center. That day, Boldwin weakened into a Moderate Tropical Storm. Later that night, Boldwin's LLCC became fully exposed and started weakening rapidly. As a result, the JTWC issued their final advisory on the system. At the same time, Météo-France reported that Boldwin further weakened into a Tropical Depression. Finally, during the early hours of November 26, Météo-France issued their final warning on Boldwin, as it weakened into a remnant low, as moderate vertical wind shear had torn the system apart.

=== Intense Tropical Cyclone Claudia ===
- Intense tropical cyclone (MFR)
- Category 4 tropical cyclone (SSHWS)
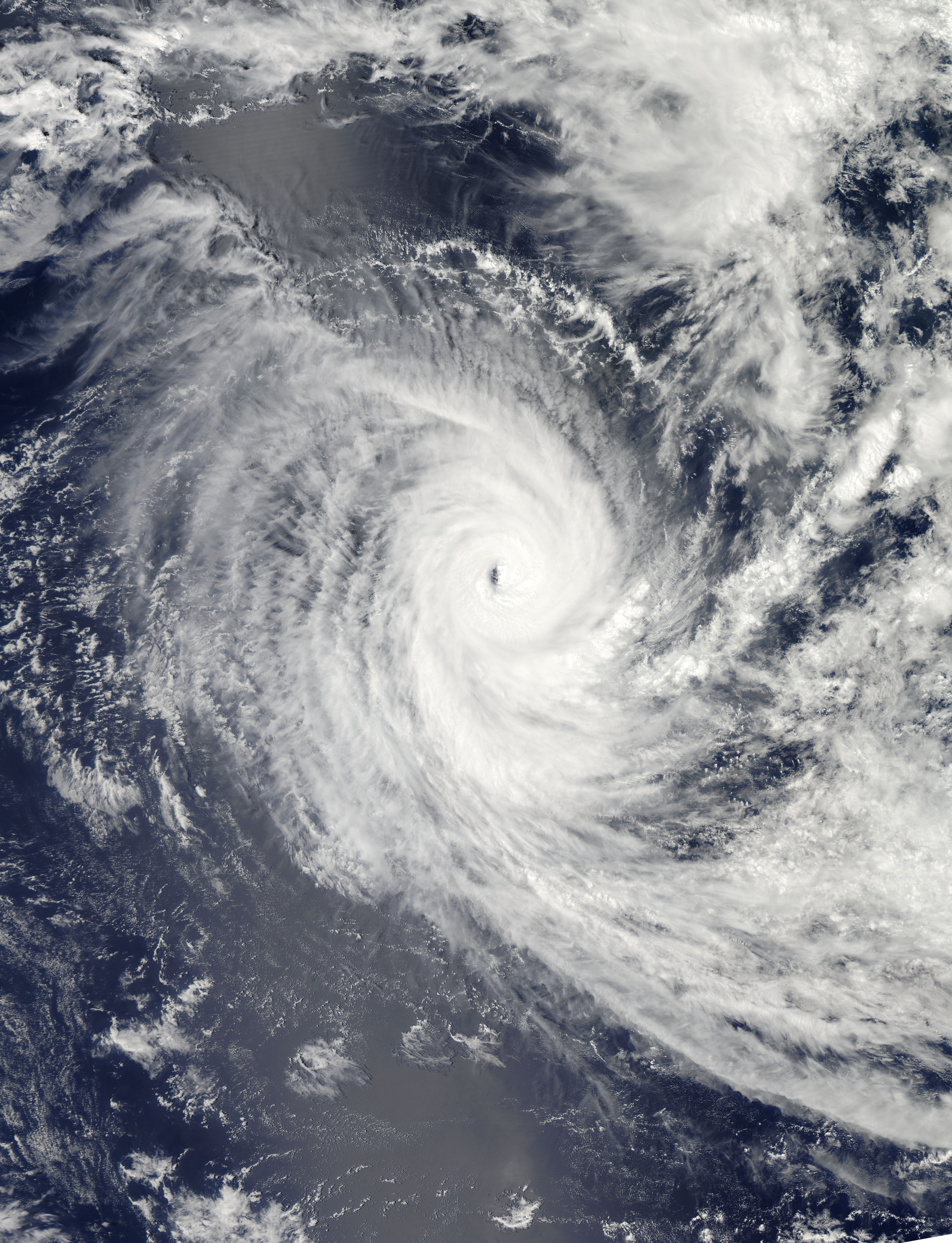
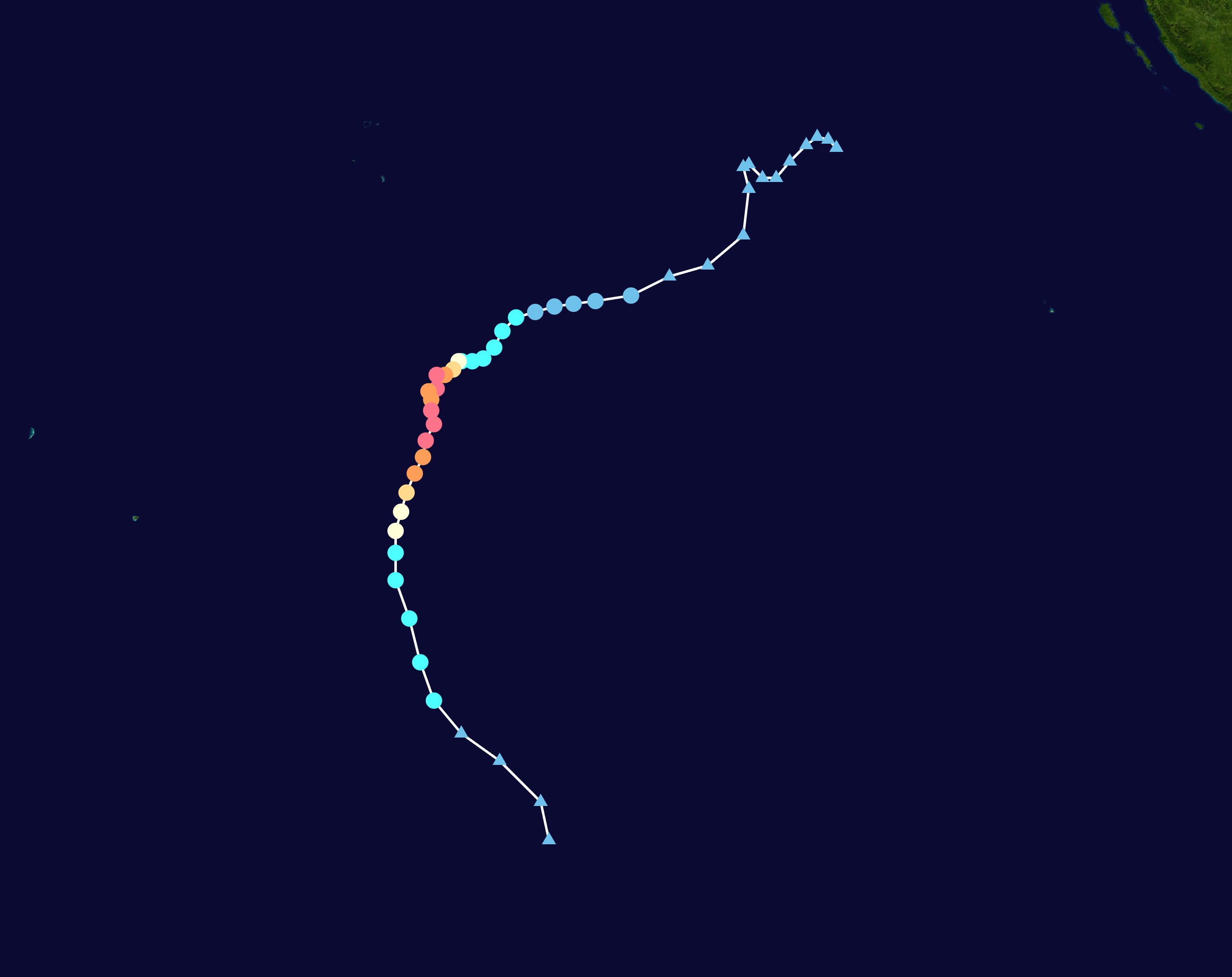
- Duration: December 6 – December 13
- Peak intensity: 175 km/h (110 mph) (10-min); 940 hPa (mbar)

On 29 November the NRL began monitoring a disturbance initially located in the Australian area of responsibility. The disturbance moved south-westwards over the following week, strengthening as wind shear decreased. On 6 December, JTWC issued a TCFA and RSMC La Réunion commenced advisories for a Tropical Disturbance. The disturbance was then located about 900 km (550 miles) SE of Diego Garcia. The next day it was named Moderate Tropical Storm Claudia by NWS Mauritius. On December 8, Cyclone Claudia was in South Indian Ocean and had strengthened rapidly with winds over 160 km/h (100 mph). On December 10, a well-developed eye was observed, with diameter of approximately 19 km (12 mi). By December 11, Claudia's eye had dissipated, and the cyclone became more disorganized, with wind shear causing elongation from east to west. Claudia moved into sea surface temperatures below 80 °F (27 °C), as a result of the western edge of a high pressure ridge steering the system south. On December 12, high vertical wind shear near 30 knots (55.5 km/h; 34.5 mph) impacted the northwestern quadrant of the low level circulation center, exposing the center, as it became extratropical over cooler waters. On December 13, the system became fully extratropical, with the low level circulation center becoming fully exposed, and convection displaced far south of the circulation center by strong vertical wind shear.

=== Tropical Cyclone Dumile ===
- Tropical cyclone (MFR)
- Category 1 tropical cyclone (SSHWS)
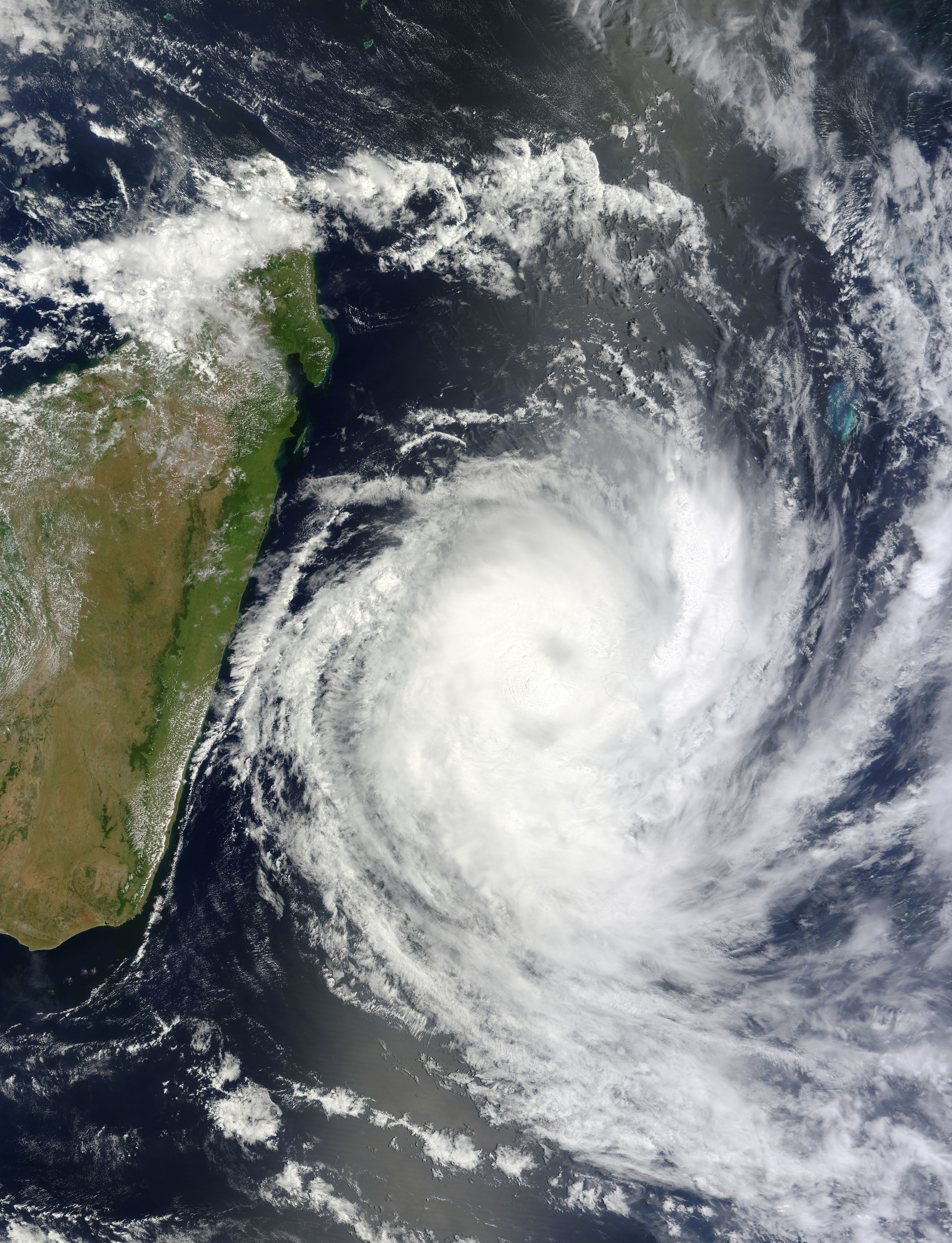
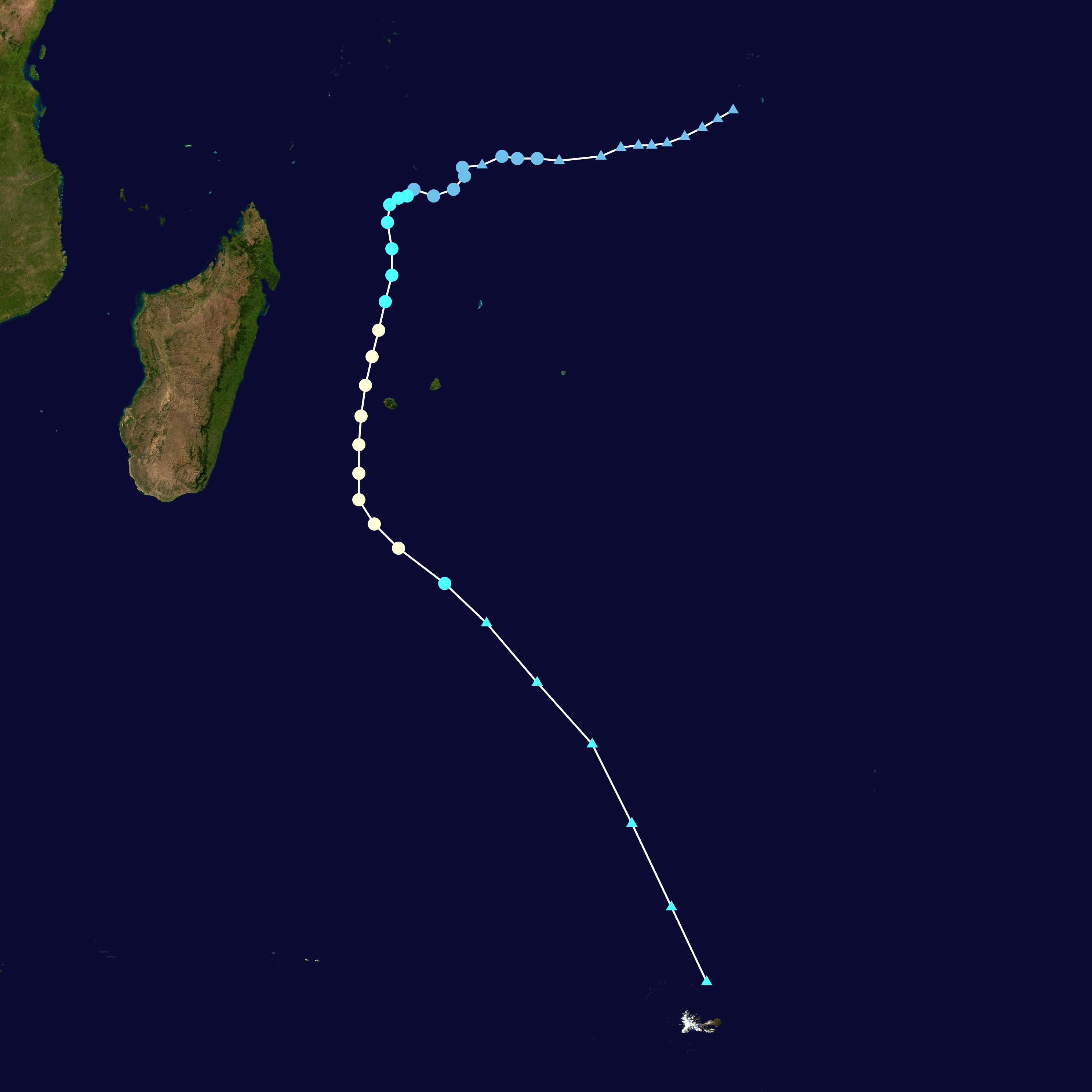
- Duration: December 29 – January 5
- Peak intensity: 130 km/h (80 mph) (10-min); 970 hPa (mbar)

On December 28 a low-pressure area continued to organize, with a significant increase in convection, located just to the west of an anticyclone.

In Mauritius, the storm produced winds up to 108 km/h (67 mph) that downed trees and power lines. Transportation across the region was several disrupted as public transit was shut down and many roads were blocked by debris. In Cassis, a billboard collapsed and damaged a nearby home. One person was found dead after his body washed ashore in Flic-en-Flac. In addition to winds, the storm brought heavy rains to the region, amounting to 192.8 mm (7.59 in) in Arnaud. Overall, damage from the storm was fairly limited in Mauritius.

Cyclone Dumile produced strong winds across Réunion Island, peaking at 180 km/h (110 mph), that downed numerous trees and power lines, leaving approximately 125,000 residents without electricity. Downed wires also led to the death of one person after he tried to remove a live wire from the roof of his home. Additionally 14 people were injured by the storm. Heavy rains also affected much of the island, with 834 mm (32.8 in) falling in Cirad over a 24‑hour span. These rains proved to be mostly beneficial, restoring reservoirs and replenishing rivers, as the island experienced below-average rainfall in the preceding two months. Significant agricultural damage took place on the island, with losses reaching €31 million (US$41.3 million). Insured losses were estimated at €3.5 million (US$4.7 million).

=== Moderate Tropical Storm Emang ===
- Moderate tropical storm (MFR)
- Tropical storm (SSHWS)
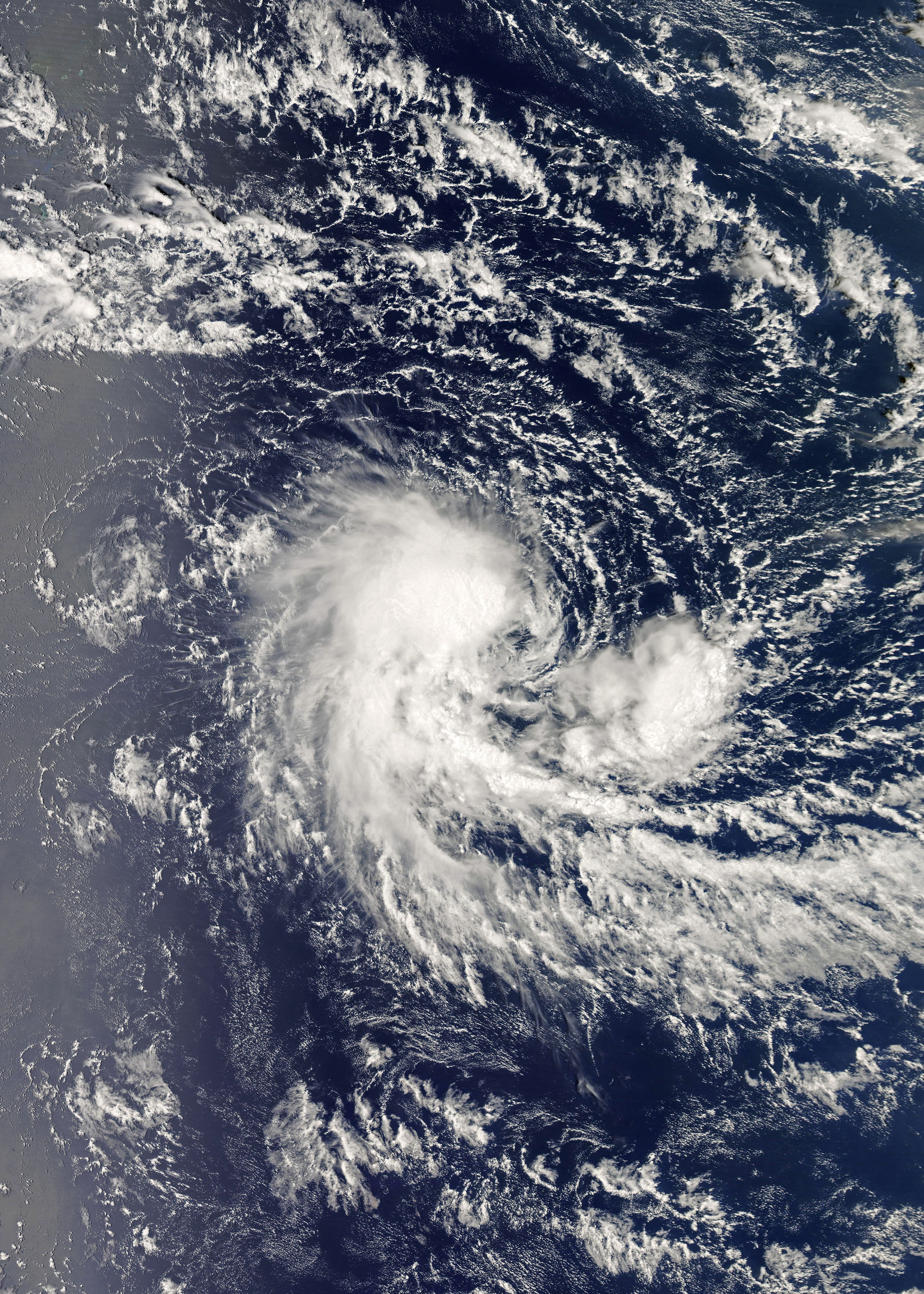
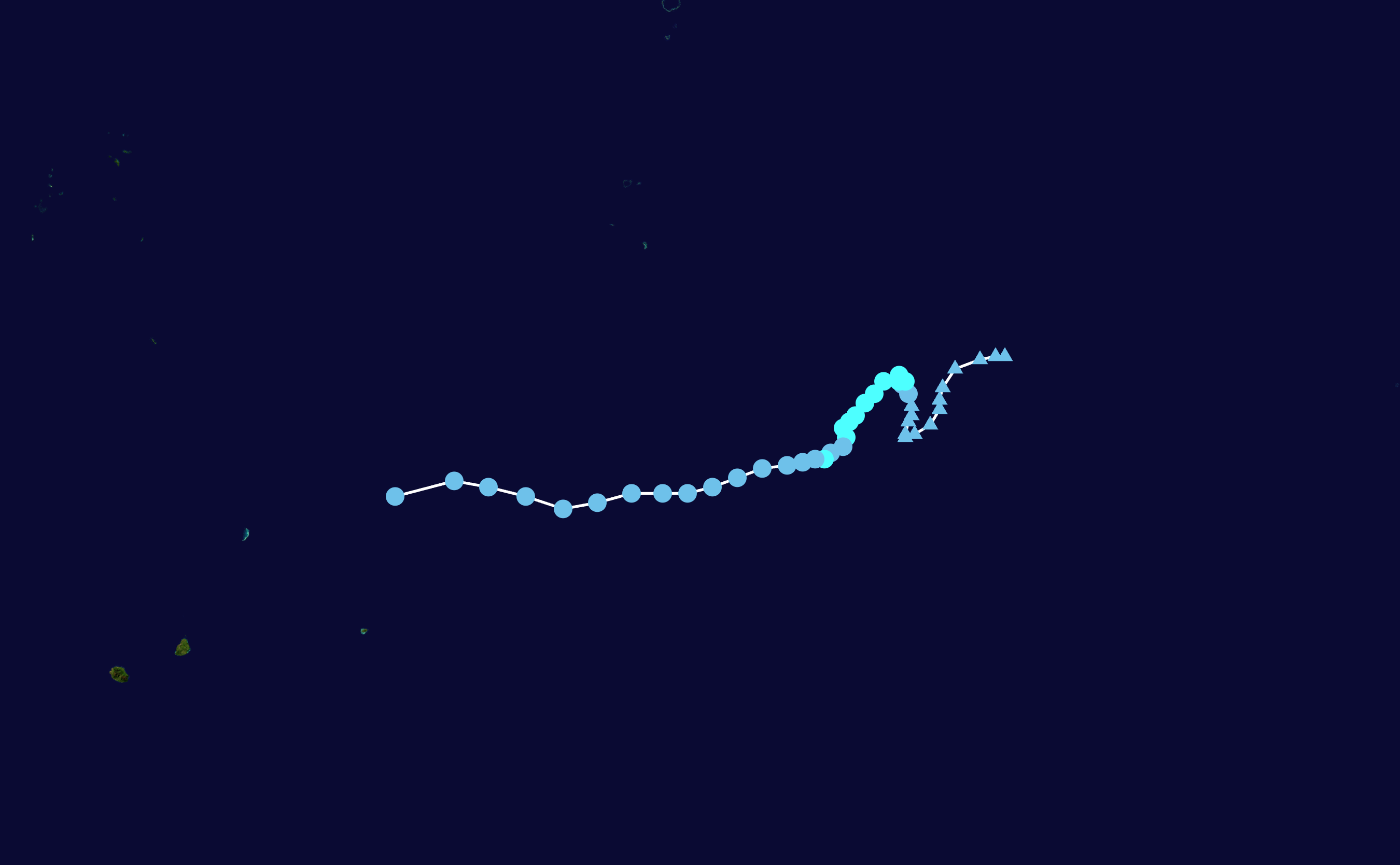
- Duration: January 12 – January 17
- Peak intensity: 65 km/h (40 mph) (10-min); 994 hPa (mbar)

On December 27 a cluster of thunderstorms developed into a weak low-pressure area. By December 28, the JTWC began tracking the system, as it began to make a significant increase in deep convection, with formative convective banding developing around the system. At that time, the disturbance was located west of an upper-level anticyclone and directly beneath a subtropical ridge center, in an area of light vertical wind shear, 805 km (500 mi) north-northwest of Learmonth, Australia. On December 30, the low-level circulation center became partially exposed due to moderate to strong easterly moving vertical wind shear, while the western part of the system still had deep, persistent convection. By January 17, Emang became disorganized and weakened into a small area of flaring convection. The low-level circulation center had become weak and poorly defined, due to moderate vertical wind shear.

=== Intense Tropical Cyclone Felleng ===
- Intense tropical cyclone (MFR)
- Category 4 tropical cyclone (SSHWS)
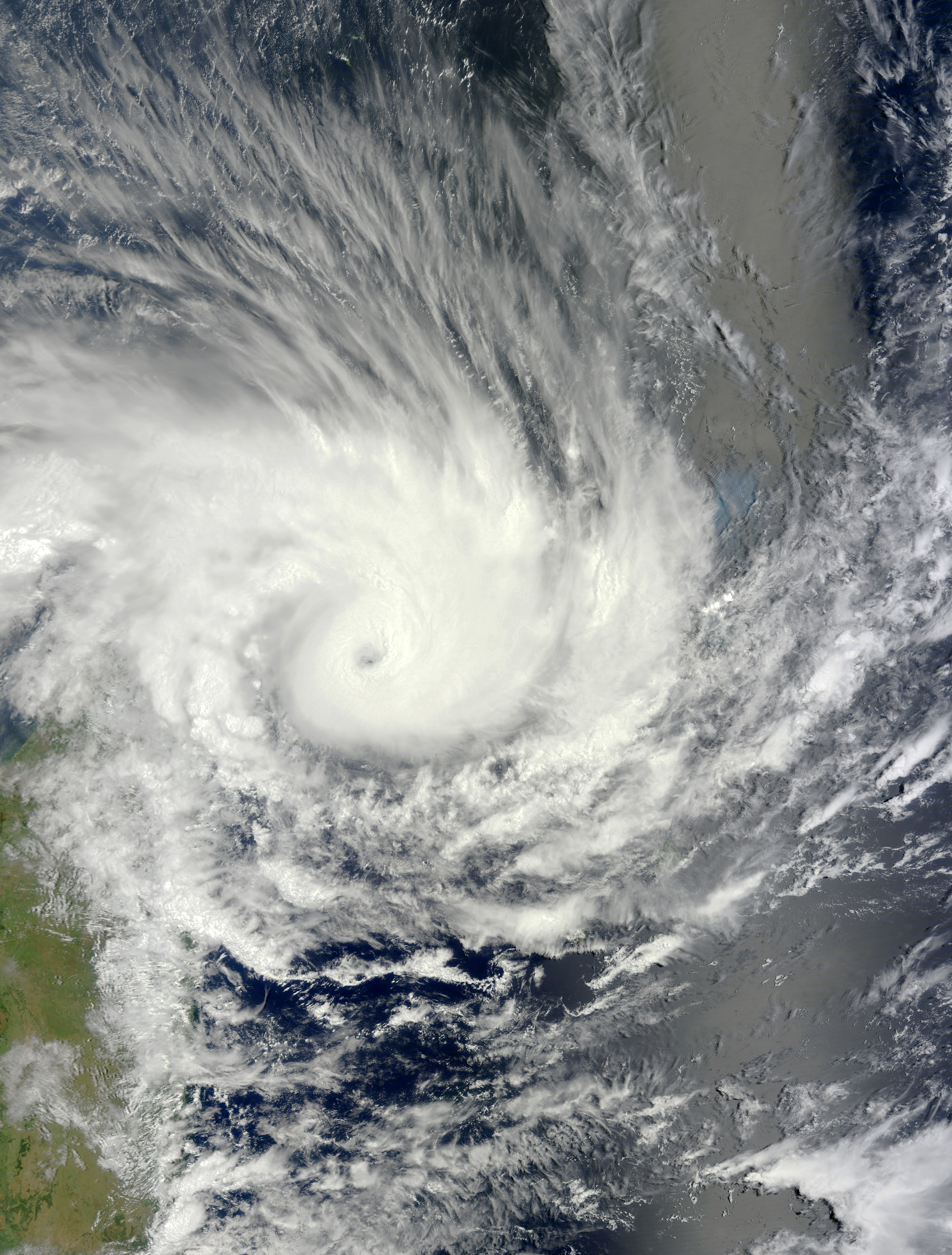
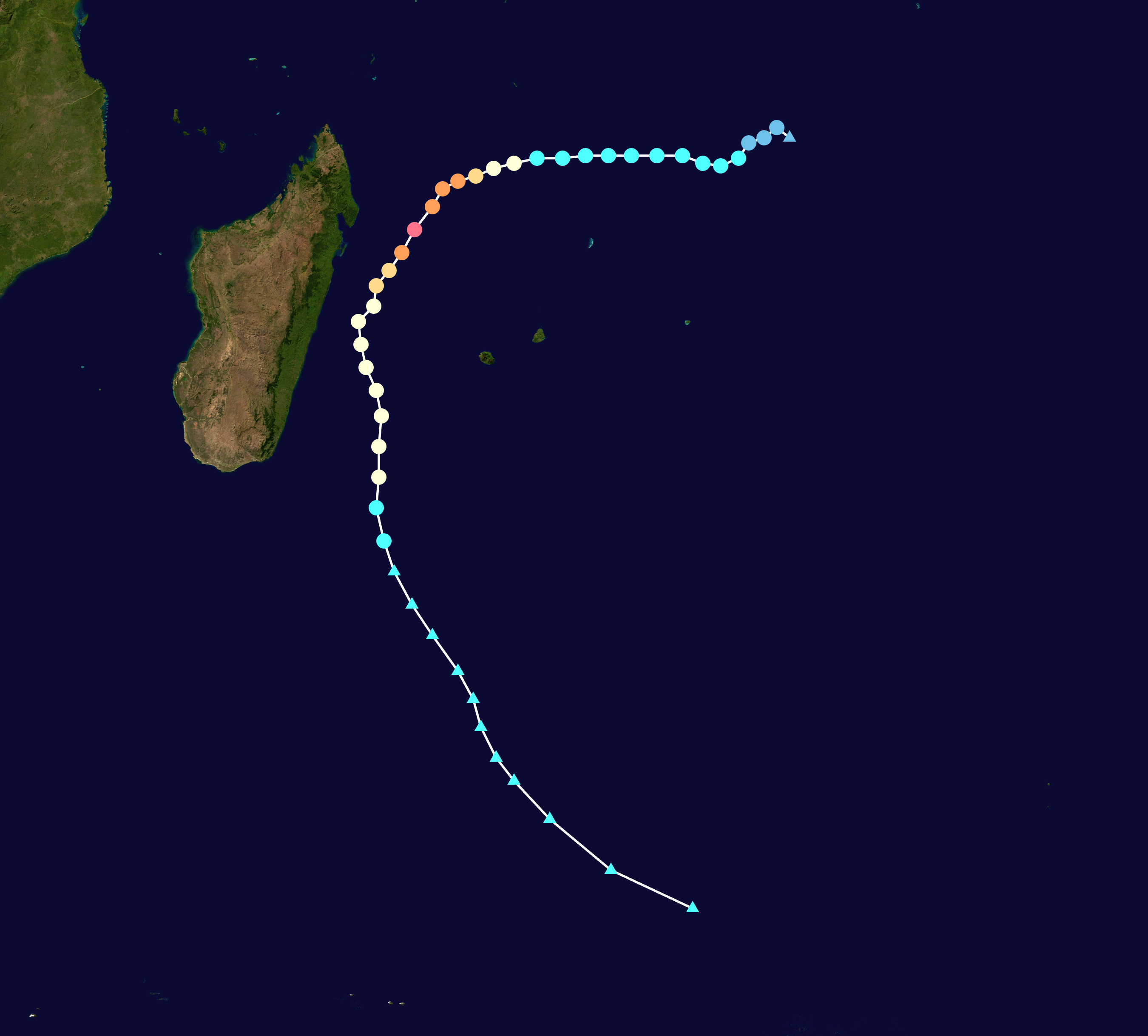
- Duration: January 26 – February 3
- Peak intensity: 165 km/h (105 mph) (10-min); 935 hPa (mbar)

On January 18, an elongated, poorly organized area of convection associated with the remnants of Tropical Storm Emang lingered near the ITCZ. By January 24, RSMC La Réunion reported a totally exposed vortex with occasional burst of convection persisted about 470 miles (755 km) NNE of Rodrigues, and 580 miles (935 km) SW of Diego Garcia. At that time it was not expected to strengthen, but early on 26 January, convective activity improved, with deep convection and redeveloped a well defined, partially exposed low level circulation center due to moderate vertical wind shear from the East, and was designated as a Tropical Depression. It continued to strengthen as it moved west, then south-west as it steadily intensified, reaching Intense Tropical Cyclone strength on 30 January while developing a well defined eye, with a deep, intense ring of convective banding forming in the eyewall. On January 31 the eye became less well defined, and started to collapse. On February 1 the system started to become elongated, and weakened into a severe tropical storm as it began its extratropical transition. By February 3, Felleng became fully extratropical, with the low level circulation center becoming totally exposed and elongated, under vertical wind shear, located to the west of the remnant convection.

Although the center of Cyclone Felleng remained offshore, heavy rain from the storm's outer bands triggered significant flooding in parts of Madagascar. Flood waters rose rapidly in the capital Antananarivo, flooding many low-lying homes, as well as several hundred hectares of rice fields. Government authorities confirmed at least 800 people have been affected by the floods in the capital alone. Across the island, 9 people were killed and 1,303 were left homeless. A total of 162 homes were destroyed while another 1,803 were damaged by flood waters, most of which were in Vatovavy-Fitovinany.

Heavy rains and winds associated with the storm also impacted Réunion Island, where 11,200 homes were left without power. Over the course of three days, up to 800 mm (31 in) of rain fell in parts of the island, resulting in significant flooding. In Plaine des Cafres, 512 mm (20.2 in) fell during a 24‑hour span.

=== Tropical Cyclone Gino ===
- Tropical cyclone (MFR)
- Category 2 tropical cyclone (SSHWS)
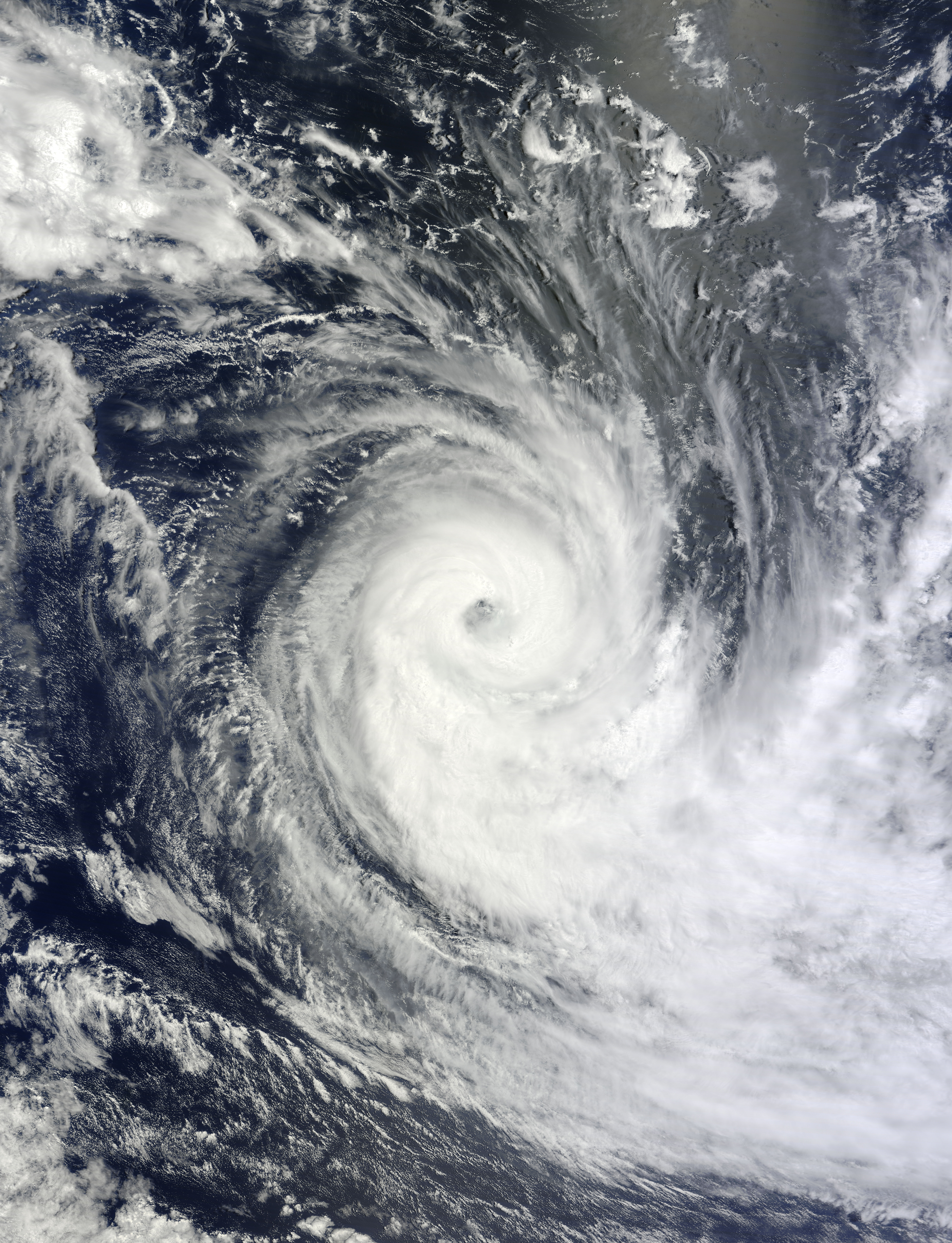
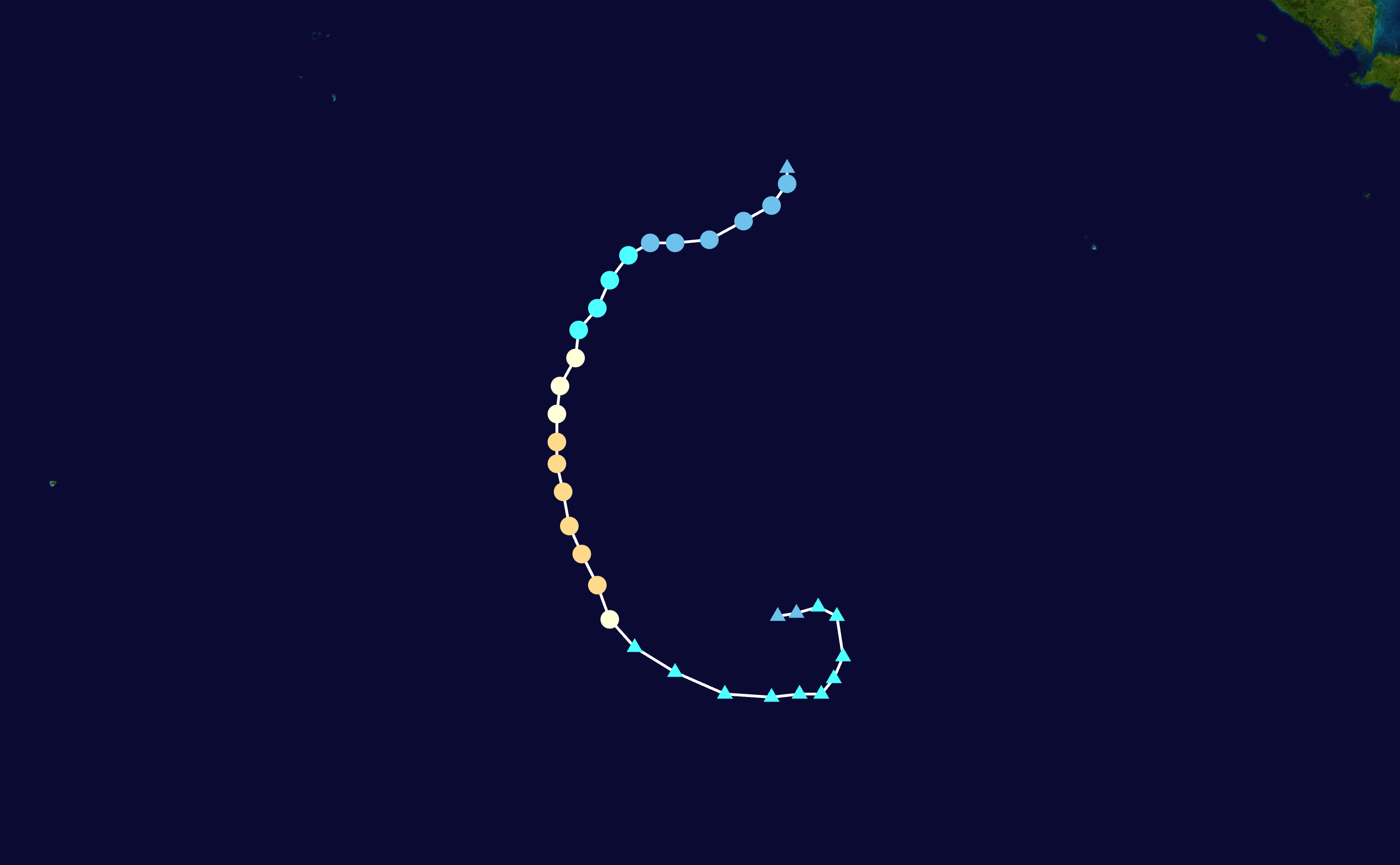
- Duration: February 11 – February 15
- Peak intensity: 140 km/h (85 mph) (10-min); 953 hPa (mbar)

On 11 February, RSMC La Réunion announced that a Tropical Depression had formed about 760 mi (1,225 km) ESE of Diego Garcia. The disturbance had first been noticed several days earlier as a Tropical Low in the Australian AoR. It was soon upgraded and named Moderate Tropical Storm Gino. On 12 February at 1500 UTC, the storm's maximum sustained winds was 75 kn (39 m/s; 139 km/h; 86 mph)making the storm the equivalent of a category one hurricane. At that time, Gino was centered near 17.1 south latitude and 79.5 east longitude, about 700 nmi (1,300 km; 810 mi) southeast of Diego Garcia. Gino moved south-southwest at 10 kn (5.1 m/s; 19 km/h; 12 mph), around the northwestern edge of a subtropical ridge of high pressure.

=== Tropical Cyclone Haruna ===
- Tropical cyclone (MFR)
- Category 3 tropical cyclone (SSHWS)
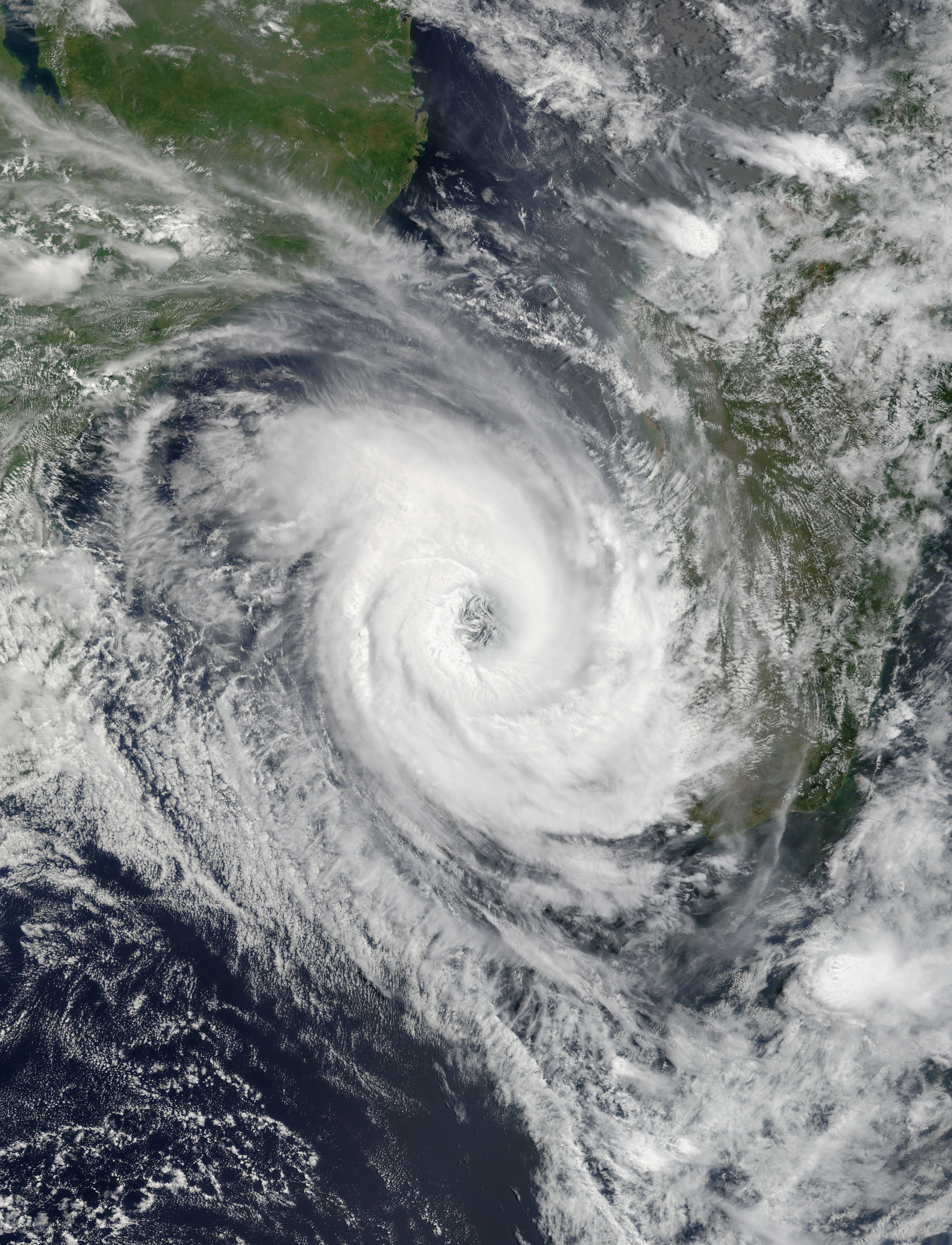
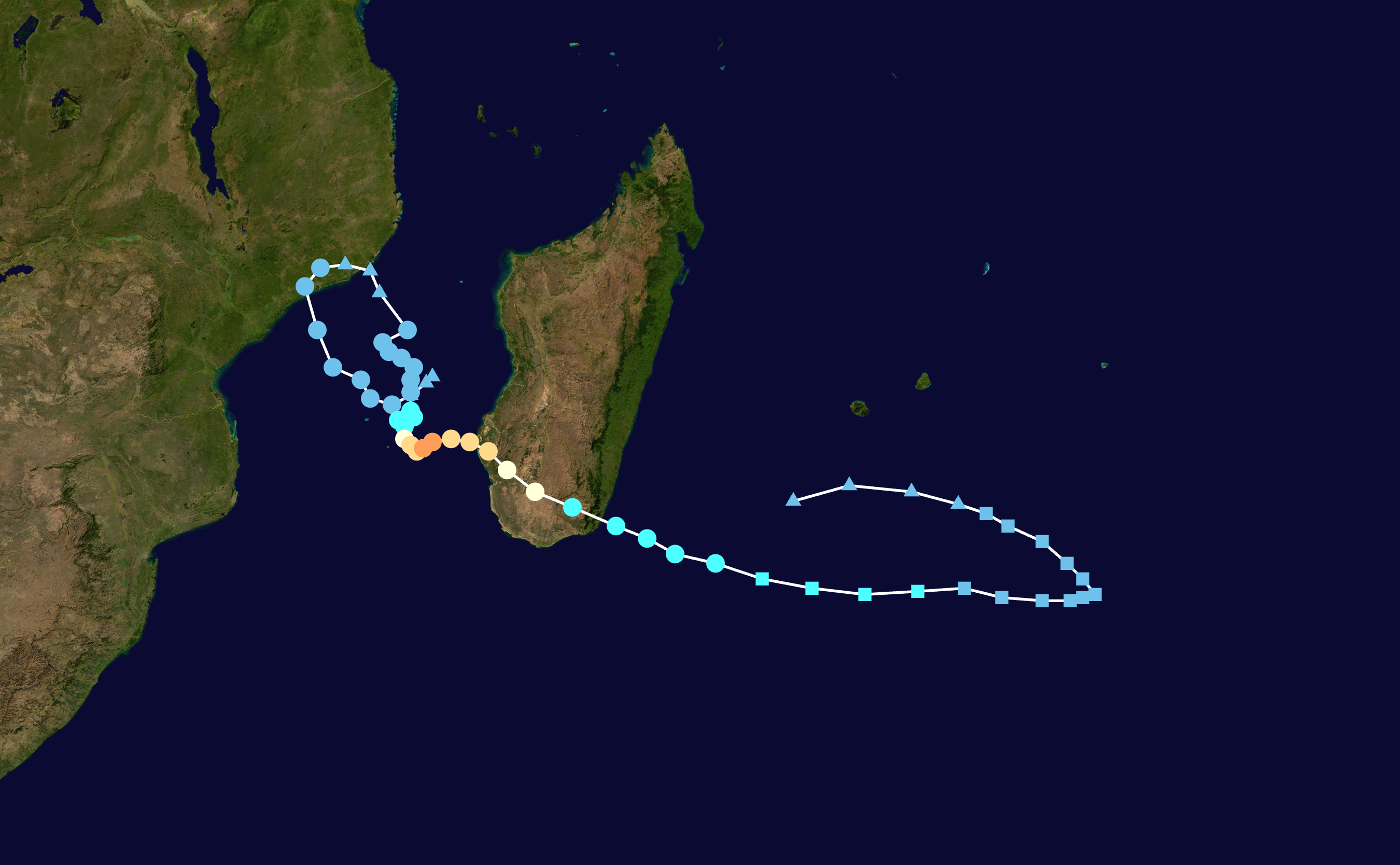
- Duration: February 18 – February 24
- Peak intensity: 150 km/h (90 mph) (10-min); 960 hPa (mbar)

In the middle of February, an area of convection persisted in the Mozambique Channel. The system shifted southward after exiting the coast of Mozambique and slowed to a drift in response to a break in the subtropical ridge. Subsequently, convection became more pronounced and Météo France classified the system as a tropical disturbance on February 18. On February 19, the system attained gale-force winds and was upgraded to Moderate Tropical Storm Haruna. The structure of Haruna continued to become more symmetrical with a large radius of maximum winds, developing a ragged eye early on February 20. Based on the improved appearance, MFR upgraded Haruna to a severe tropical storm at 0000 UTC that day. About 12 hours later, the agency upgraded Haruna further to tropical cyclone status, with 10 minute winds of 120 km/h (75 mph). That day, an approaching trough weakened the ridge to the south, causing the cyclone to slow and move erratically. MFR assessed that Haruna reached 10 minute winds of 150 km/h (95 mph) on February 20. At around 0230 UTC on February 22, the cyclone made landfall about 55 km (35 mi) south of Morombe in southwestern Madagascar. Haruna quickly weakened below cyclone status, and while over land it accelerated to the southeast. At 1200 UTC on February 24, MFR issued its last advisory after Haruna began losing tropical characteristics, designating it as a subtropical depression. The next day, the JTWC also discontinued advisories on the storm, noting that Haruna was dissipating about 665 km (415 mi) south-southwest of Réunion.

Striking the southwestern coast of Madagascar, Cyclone Haruna impacted areas that usually do not see tropical cyclones. The most significant damage took place north of Toliara around the Mikea Forest. The storm brought wind gusts estimated at 210 km/h (130 mph), resulting in extensive damage. Many homes lost their roofs and numerous roads were blocked by debris, isolating communities. Several days of heavy rain caused extensive flooding, especially in Morombe where approximately 70 percent of the city was destroyed due to flash flooding and dam collapses. In nearby Toliara, dozens of people were evacuated due to similarly dangerous flooding. At least 24 people were killed across southern Madagascar and another 16 were listed as missing. In addition, at least 92 were injured and nearly 10,000 left homeless after the passage of Haruna.

=== Tropical Cyclone Imelda ===
- Tropical cyclone (MFR)
- Category 2 tropical cyclone (SSHWS)
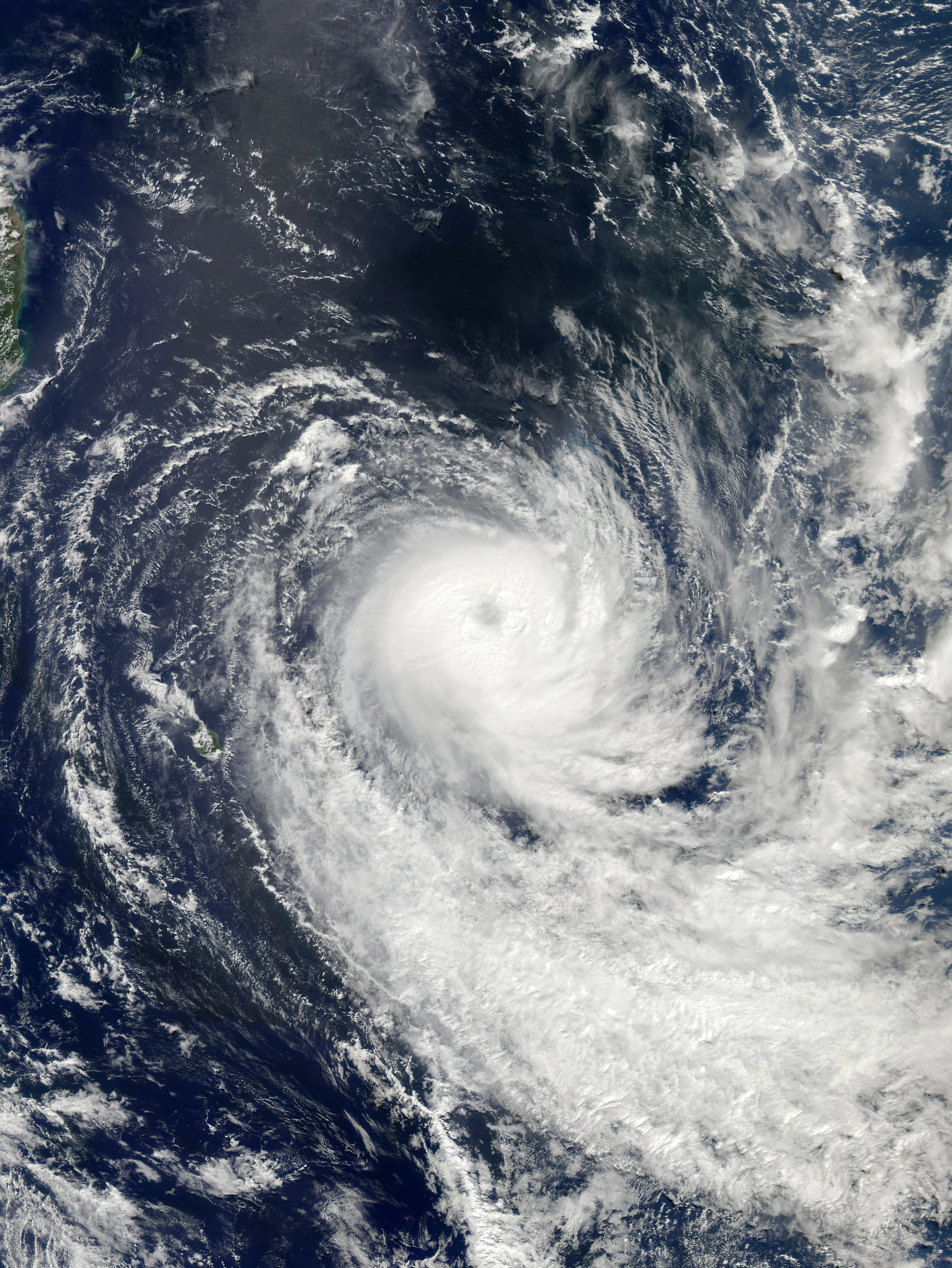
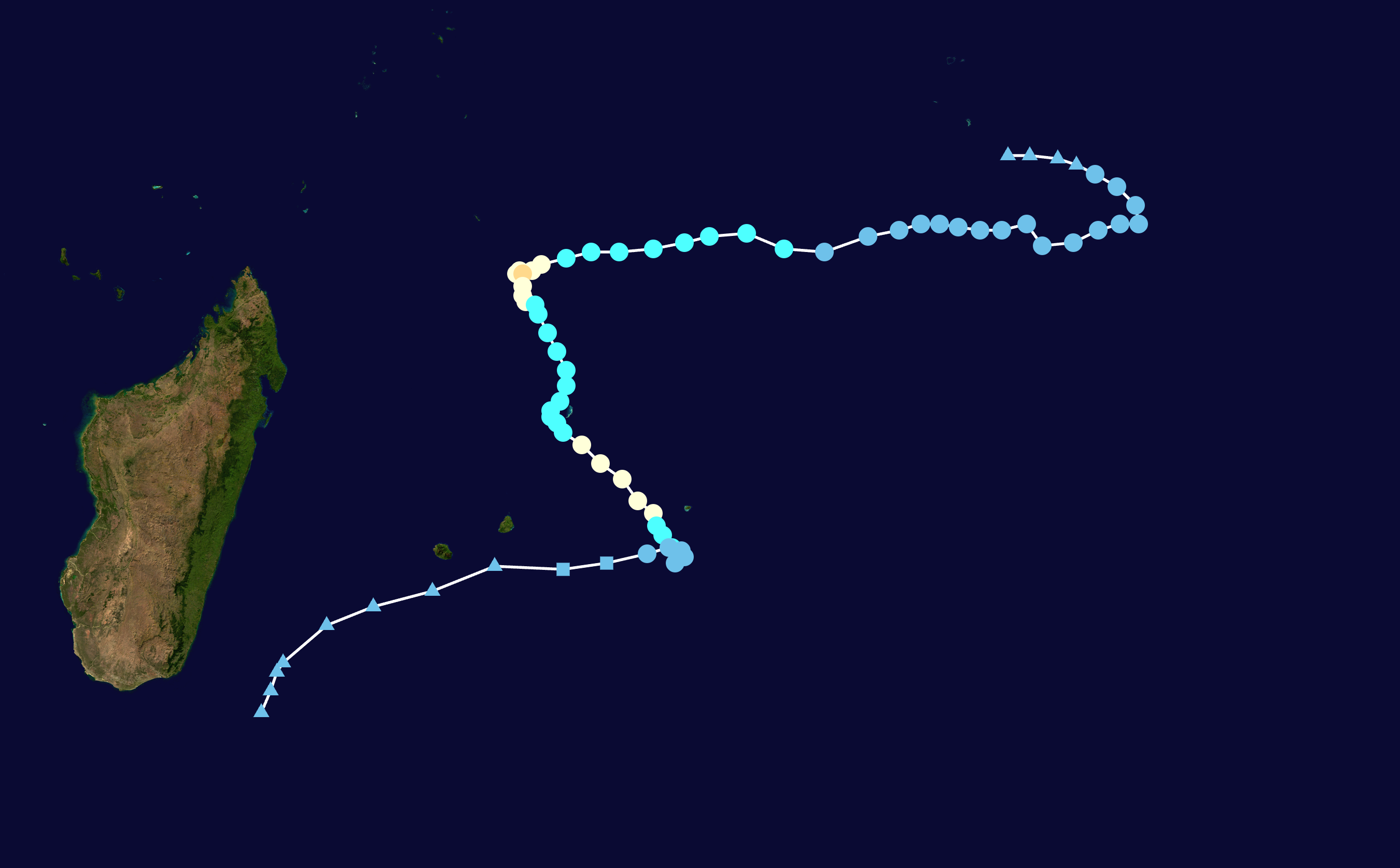
- Duration: April 5 – April 16
- Peak intensity: 150 km/h (90 mph) (10-min); 960 hPa (mbar)

On April 3, the Joint Typhoon Warning Center started tracking an area of weak, shallow convection located around a low-level circulation center (LLCC) near 8.5°S 75.6°E. By April 4, the system developed flaring convection around a consolidating, partially exposed LLCC. On April 5, the system developed convective bands that have further deepened, and wrapped tighter around the LLCC. Later that day, the RSMC designated the system Zone of Disturbed Weather 10.

=== Moderate Tropical Storm Jamala ===
- Moderate tropical storm (MFR)
- Tropical storm (SSHWS)
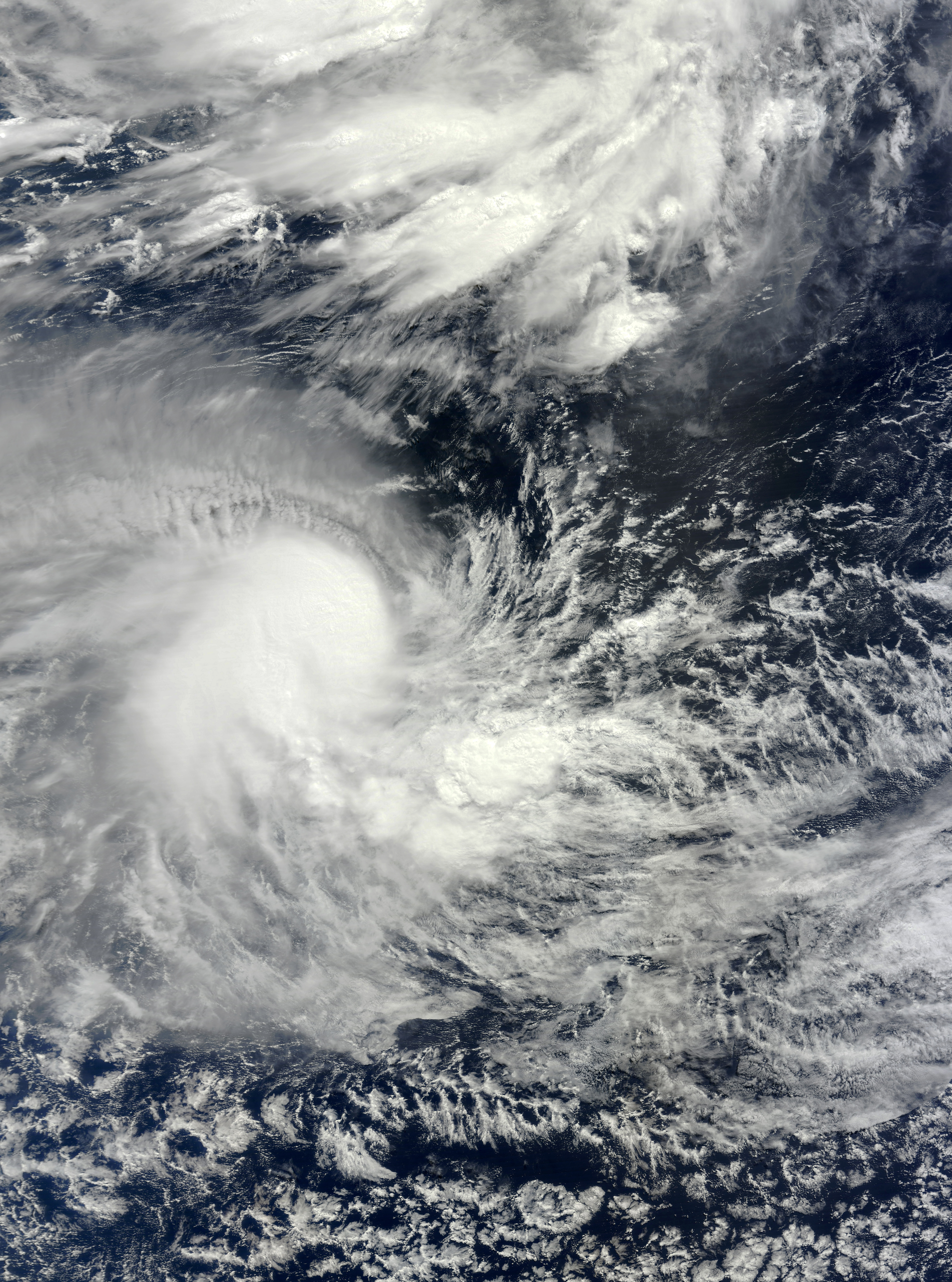
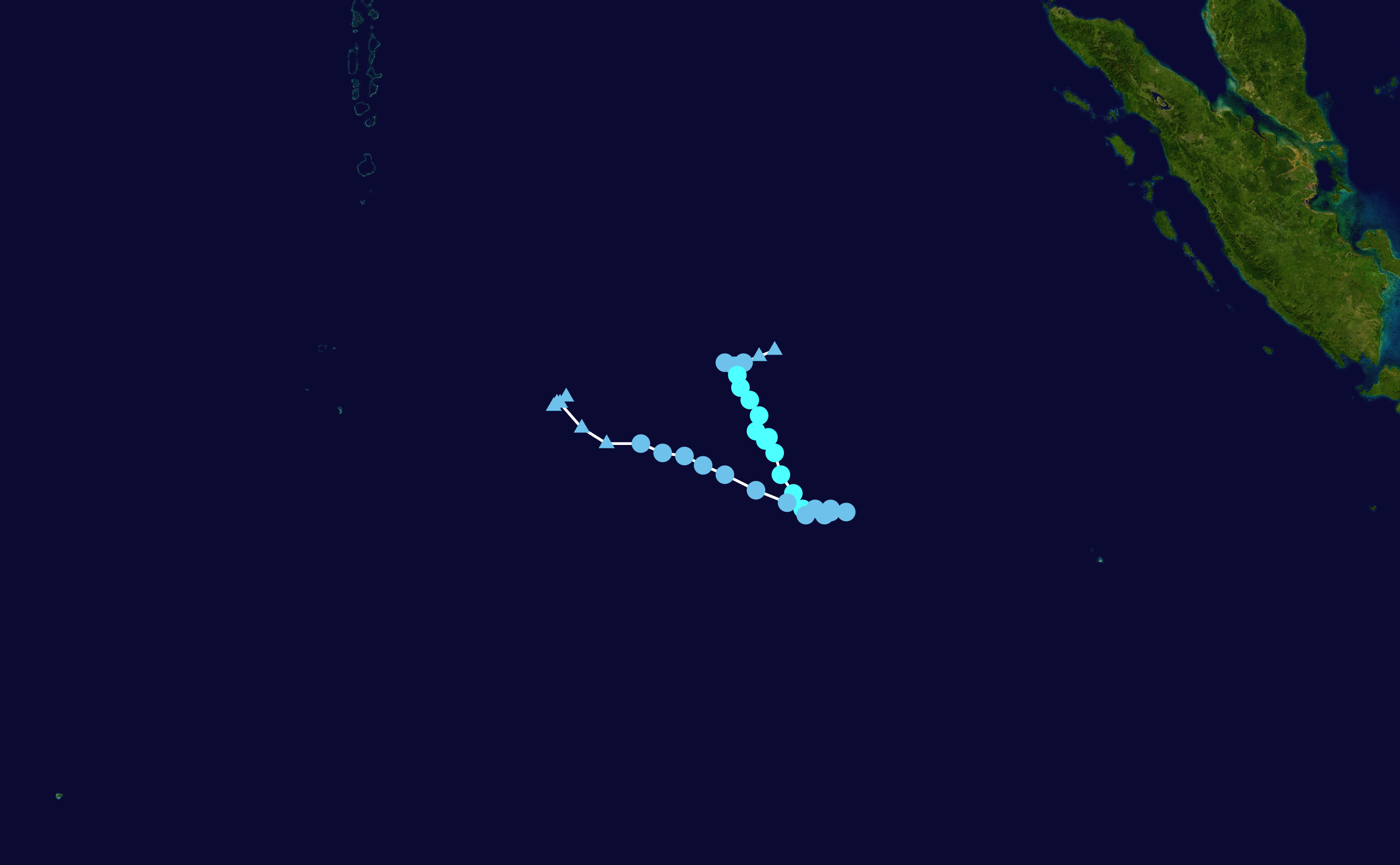
- Duration: May 9 – May 11
- Peak intensity: 75 km/h (45 mph) (10-min); 992 hPa (mbar)

In the middle of May, Tropical Storm Jamala existed in the northeastern portion of the basin.

== Storm names ==
Within the South-west Indian Ocean Tropical Depressions and Subtropical Depressions that are judged to have 10-minute sustained windspeeds of 65 km/h, (40 mph) by the Regional Specialized Meteorological Center on La Réunion Island, France (RSMC La Réunion) are usually assigned a name. However it is the Sub-Regional Tropical Cyclone Advisory Centers in Mauritius and Madagascar who name the systems. The Sub-Regional Tropical Cyclone Advisory Center in Mauritius names the storm should it intensify into a moderate tropical storm between 55°E and 90°E, if the storm should intensify into a moderate tropical storm between 30°E and 55°E then the Sub-Regional Tropical Cyclone Advisory Center in Madagascar assigns the appropriate name to the storm. New name lists are used every year, whilst a name is normally only used once so thus far no names are retired. For the first time this year tropical cyclones that move into this region from the Australian Region will not be renamed by the Sub-Regional Tropical Cyclone Advisory Center in Mauritius.

- Anais
- Boldwin
- Claudia
- Dumile
- Emang
- Felleng
- Gino
- Haruna
- Imelda
- Jamala
- Kachay (unused)
- Luciano (unused)
- Mariam (unused)
- Njazi (unused)
- Onias (unused)
- Pelagie (unused)
- Quiliro (unused)
- Richard (unused)
- Solani (unused)
- Tamim (unused)
- Urilia (unused)
- Vuyane (unused)
- Wagner (unused)
- Xusa (unused)
- Yarona (unused)
- Zacarias (unused)

== Season effects ==
This table lists all of the tropical cyclones and subtropical cyclones that were monitored during the 2012–2013 South-West Indian Ocean cyclone season. Information on their intensity, duration, name, and areas affected, primarily comes from RSMC La Réunion. Death and damage reports come from either press reports or the relevant national disaster management agency while the damage totals are given in 2012 USD.

| Name | Dates | Peak intensity | | | Areas affected | Damage (USD) | Deaths | Ref(s). |
| Name | Dates | Category | Wind speed | Pressure | Areas affected | Damage (USD) | Deaths | Ref(s). |
|---|---|---|---|---|---|---|---|---|
| Anais | October 12–19 | Intense tropical cyclone | 185 km/h (115 mph) | 945 hPa (27.91 inHg) | Diego Garcia, Madagascar | None | None | |
| 02 | November 15–16 | Tropical disturbance | 45 km/h (30 mph) | 1,004 hPa (29.65 inHg) | None | None | None | |
| Boldwin | November 23–26 | Severe tropical storm | 100 km/h (60 mph) | 985 hPa (29.09 inHg) | None | None | None | |
| Claudia | December 6–13 | Intense tropical cyclone | 175 km/h (110 mph) | 940 hPa (27.76 inHg) | None | None | None | |
| Dumile | December 29 – January 5 | Tropical cyclone | 130 km/h (80 mph) | 970 hPa (28.64 inHg) | Mauritius, Réunion Island | $46 million | 2 | |
| Emang | January 12–17 | Moderate tropical storm | 65 km/h (40 mph) | 994 hPa (29.35 inHg) | None | None | None | |
| Felleng | January 26 – February 3 | Intense tropical cyclone | 165 km/h (105 mph) | 935 hPa (27.61 inHg) | Seychelles, Madagascar, Mauritius, Réunion Island | Unknown | 9 | |
| Gino | February 11–15 | Tropical cyclone | 140 km/h (85 mph) | 953 hPa (28.14 inHg) | None | None | None | |
| Haruna | February 18–25 | Tropical cyclone | 150 km/h (95 mph) | 960 hPa (28.35 inHg) | Mozambique, Madagascar | Unknown | 25 | |
| Imelda | April 5–16 | Tropical cyclone | 150 km/h (95 mph) | 960 hPa (28.35 inHg) | St Brandon, Mauritius, Rodrigues | None | None | |
| Jamala | May 9–11 | Moderate tropical storm | 75 km/h (45 mph) | 992 hPa (29.29 inHg) | None | None | None | |
Season aggregates
| 11 systems | October 12 – May 11 | | 185 km/h (115 mph) | 935 hPa (27.61 inHg) | | >$46 million | 50 | |

== See also ==
- Tropical cyclones in 2012 and 2013
- South-West Indian Ocean tropical cyclone
- List of Southern Hemisphere tropical cyclone seasons
- Atlantic hurricane seasons: 2012, 2013
- Pacific hurricane seasons: 2012, 2013
- Pacific typhoon seasons: 2012, 2013
- North Indian Ocean cyclone seasons: 2012, 2013
- 2012–13 Australian region cyclone season
- 2012–13 South Pacific cyclone season
