= Cyclone Fakir =

Tropical Cyclone in 2018

Tropical Cyclone Fakir
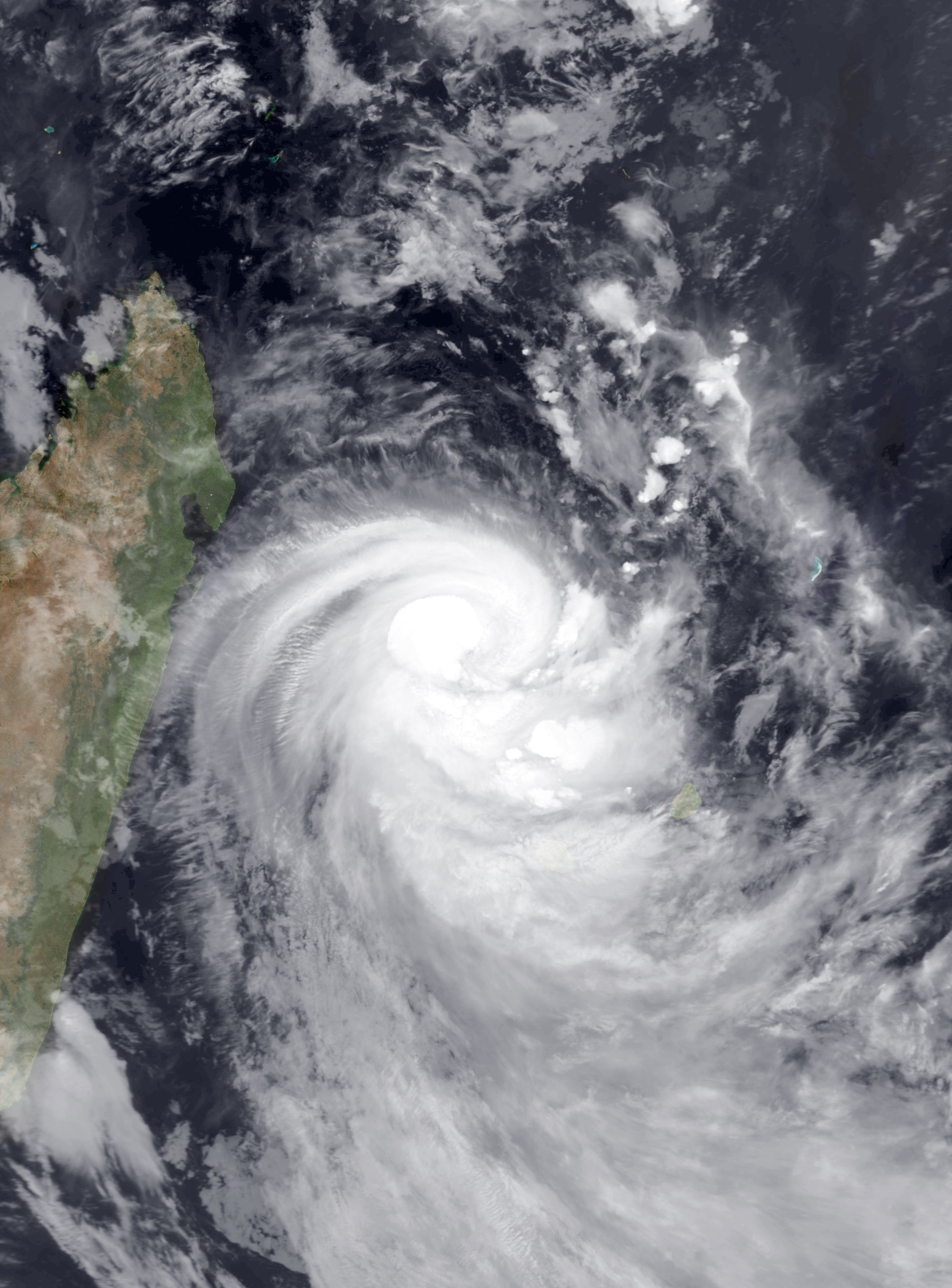
- Fakir strengthening east of Madagascar on April 23

Meteorological history
- Formed: 22 April 2018
- Post-tropical: 25 April 2018
- Dissipated: 26 April 2018

Tropical cyclone
- 10-minute sustained (MF)
- Highest winds: 130 km/h (80 mph)
- Highest gusts: 185 km/h (115 mph)
- Lowest pressure: 975 hPa (mbar); 28.79 inHg

Category 1-equivalent tropical cyclone
- 1-minute sustained (SSHWS/JTWC)
- Highest winds: 140 km/h (85 mph)
- Lowest pressure: 982 hPa (mbar); 29.00 inHg

Overall effects
- Fatalities: 2 total
- Damage: >$17.7 million (2018 USD)
- Areas affected: Mauritius, Réunion
- IBTrACS
- Part of the 2017–18 South-West Indian Ocean cyclone season

Tropical Cyclone Fakir was a short-lived yet damaging tropical cyclone that affected Réunion and Mauritius in late April 2018. The eighth tropical system and seventh named storm of the 2017–18 South-West Indian Ocean cyclone season, Fakir originated from an area of disturbed weather that developed north-northeast of Madagascar on 20 April 2018. The system concentrated into a tropical depression by 23 April, and was given the name Fakir later that day. It rapidly intensified while moving quickly south-southeastwards despite the presence of hostile wind shear, and reached its peak intensity early on 24 April, hours before passing just east of Réunion. Fakir succumbed to the wind shear shortly after and weakened as quickly as it had strengthened, becoming a post-tropical cyclone on 25 April. The remnant system decelerated and turned east-northeast while continuing to weaken, and dissipated the next day.

Fakir was the fifth and last in a series of cyclones to affect Réunion in the first half of 2018, after cyclones Ava, Berguitta, Dumazile, and Eliakim. Strong, gusty winds and floods and landslides resulting from heavy rains occurred across Réunion from 25 to 26 April, causing severe damage to agriculture and infrastructure. Schools and businesses were shut ahead of the adverse weather, and flights were delayed at the island's airports. Power lines were blown down or damaged by fallen trees in many areas, resulting in widespread power outages. Water supplies were also disrupted in some areas. Floods and mudslides affected buildings and public facilities all over Réunion, bringing about significant property damage and racking up large repair costs. A mudslide killed two people in L'Étang-Salé. Agriculture was heavily affected, with crops ruined by heavy rains and mudslides and livestock drowned by floodwaters. Total damage in Réunion exceeded €15 million (US$17.7 million). Immediately after the storm, disaster declarations were issued in 15 municipalities and cleanup operations commenced. In the following months, aid was distributed to farmers to help them recoup losses and restart their farms. However, the prices of fruits and vegetables remained elevated up to half a year after Fakir. In nearby Mauritius, cyclone warnings were issued and schools were closed on 24 April. However, impacts were much less severe than in Réunion, being limited to fallen trees, flooded roadways, and mild crop damage.

== Meteorological history ==
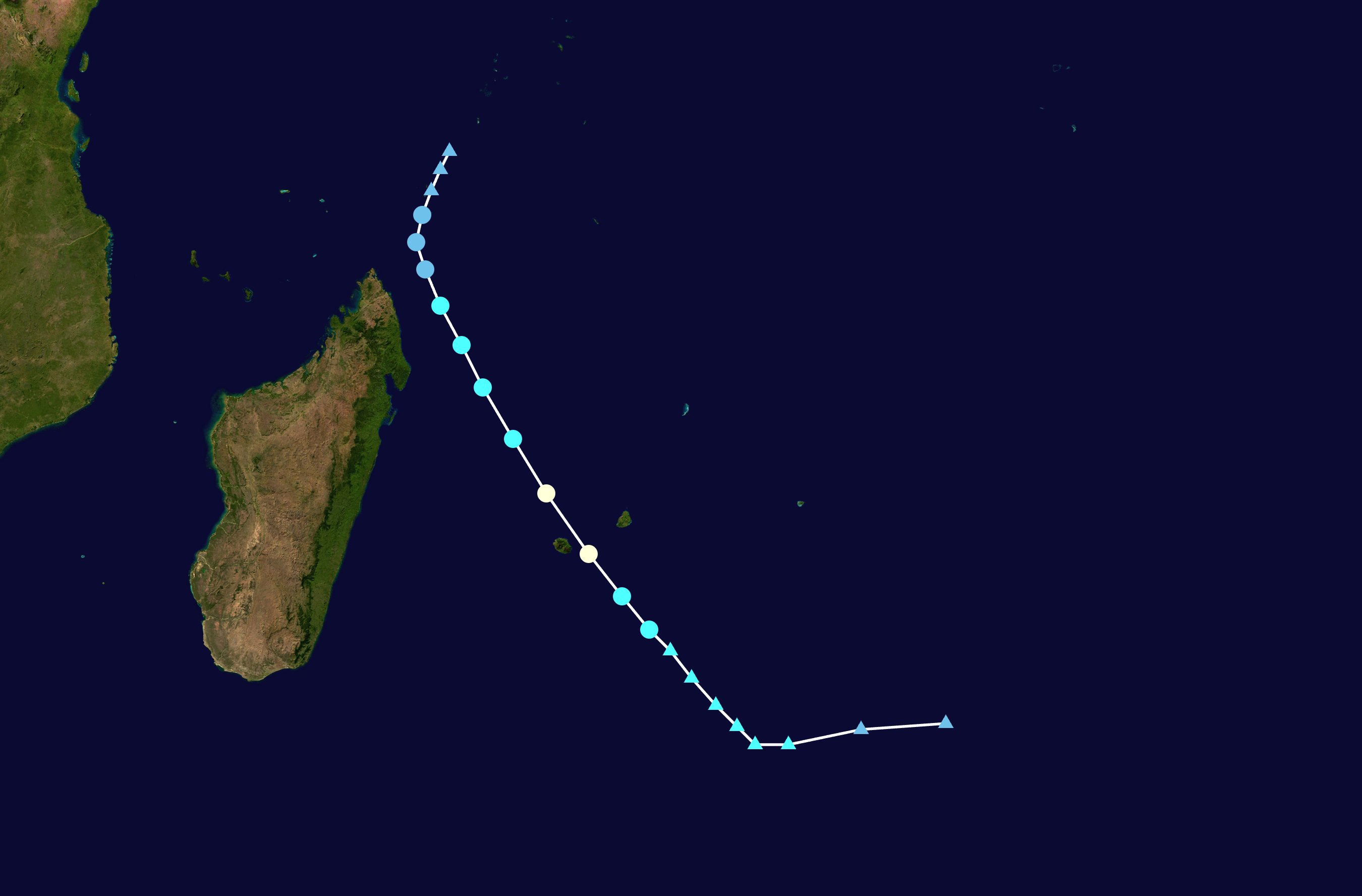
Map plotting the storm's track and intensity, according to the Saffir–Simpson scale Map key Saffir–Simpson scale Tropical depression (≤38 mph, ≤62 km/h) Tropical storm (39–73 mph, 63–118 km/h) Category 1 (74–95 mph, 119–153 km/h) Category 2 (96–110 mph, 154–177 km/h) Category 3 (111–129 mph, 178–208 km/h) Category 4 (130–156 mph, 209–251 km/h) Category 5 (≥157 mph, ≥252 km/h) Unknown Storm type Tropical cyclone Subtropical cyclone Extratropical cyclone, remnant low, tropical disturbance, or monsoon depression

On 20 April, Météo-France La Réunion (MFR) began to monitor an area of disturbed weather, characterized by a large clockwise surface circulation, to the north-northeast of Madagascar. Tropical cyclogenesis was not initially anticipated by the MFR, owing to modest easterly wind shear and the absence of significant low-level convergence, as well as an expected increase in northerly wind shear. The system deepened slightly on 22 April, and the MFR noted it had become a tropical disturbance at 06:00 UTC. It organized more quickly later that day, with thunderstorms developing near the system's center and forming a spiral rainband. This led the MFR to classify the system as a tropical depression at 00:00 UTC on 23 April. The Joint Typhoon Warning Center (JTWC) simultaneously assessed the system as a tropical storm. (Note: While not designated by the World Meteorological Organization as a Regional Specialized Meteorological Center, the JTWC issues warnings on tropical cyclones in all of the major tropical cyclone basins to supplement the activities of United States government agencies.) At the time, the system was moving quickly south-southeast, steered by a ridge to its east and an upper-level trough to its west. Rapid development continued through 23 April as an eye feature became visible on microwave satellite imagery, and the system was christened Moderate Tropical Storm Fakir at 11:00 UTC by Météo Madagascar; (Note: While the MFR is the Regional Specialized Meteorological Center for the South-West Indian Ocean basin, naming of tropical cyclones in the basin is done in conjunction with Météo Madagascar or Mauritius Meteorological Services.) post-analysis by the MFR revealed that the cyclone had already reached this strength by 06:00 UTC.

Fakir continued to intensify over the next few hours and developed a central dense overcast, aided by significant upper-level divergence over its southern half. Despite increasing northwesterly wind shear from the aforementioned upper-level trough, the storm's rapid south-southeastward motion temporarily offset the hostile effects of the shear, allowing it to strengthen more than expected. The system became a severe tropical storm at 18:00 UTC on 23 April and peaked as a mature tropical cyclone at 00:00 UTC on 24 April, possessing 10-minute sustained winds of 130 km/h (80 mph), gusts to 185 km/h (115 mph), and a minimum central pressure of 975 hPa (28.79 inHg), as assessed by the MFR. Meanwhile, the JTWC estimated 1-minute sustained winds of 140 km/h (85 mph). Wind shear began to take its toll on the cyclone shortly after, with the eye feature becoming less apparent on satellite imagery. Fakir passed just 20 km (12 mi) off the eastern coast of Réunion at 05:00 UTC, where a weather station reported a minimum pressure of 981 hPa (28.97 inHg). The cyclone weakened back to a severe tropical storm by 12:00 UTC, and further degraded to a moderate tropical storm six hours later as its center of circulation became exposed to the northwest of its remaining thunderstorm activity. These thunderstorms soon dissipated too as dry air associated with the upper-level trough to the west was driven into the circulation by the strong wind shear, while sea surface temperatures decreased along the cyclone's path. As such, the MFR and JTWC declared Fakir post-tropical at 00:00 UTC on 25 April. The remnants slowed down and turned east-northeastwards on 25 and 26 April under the influence of a low-level ridge while continuing to spin down, eventually dissipating entirely just after 18:00 UTC on 26 April.

Tropical cyclones passing close to Réunion in 2018, including Ava, Berguitta, Dumazile, and Fakir, caused a large reduction in the amount of mid- to upper-level clouds over the island. A combination of the Madden–Julian oscillation and tropical cyclones Dumazile, Eliakim, and Fakir resulted in a westward flow of moisture, causing severe rainfall over Kenya during March and April 2018.

== Preparations and impact ==
=== Réunion ===
Fakir brought wind and rain to the island of Réunion, causing flooding and mudslides which impacted travel. High waves up to 8 m (26 ft) high affected the northern and eastern coasts of Réunion. A 12-hour rainfall total of 415 mm (16.3 in) was recorded at Hauts de Sainte Rose. Rainfall across the island averaged 200–300 mm (7.9–11.8 in) for that period. Sustained winds of 100 km/h (62 mph) and gusts up to 176 km/h (109 mph) occurred in Gros Piton Sainte-Rose. Flights to and from Johannesburg, Mauritius, and Rodrigues were either delayed or canceled due to inclement weather conditions. A tree was felled by the storm, blocking a street in Floréal. Around 280 homes lost power in Flacq, Trianon, and Henrietta after tree limbs damaged power lines. Metal sheeting damaged a high-voltage electrical line near Quatre-Bornes, leaving many customers without electricity. Electrical wires were downed in Bois-des-Amourettes, and power poles were felled in St-Pierre, Bois des Amourettes, Mahébourg, and Belle-Mare. Blackouts occurred in multiple towns. Winds downed a streetlight in Rose-Hill and a power pole in Agrément, St-Pierre. Signs for businesses in Sorèze, Plaine-Magnien, Bagatelle, and Curepipe were damaged by winds. A football field and several residences were inundated by floodwaters in Rivière-du-Rempart. During the storm, the Special Mobile Force worked to clear a road in Pointe-aux-Sables.

Twelve waste and recycling centers were closed, and the Kar'Ouest transportation system was disrupted due to severe weather. The latter reopened on 24 April. A married couple was killed on the southern side of the island, near Étang-Salé, after a mudslide buried their house. At least 114,000 residences lost power during the storm, however, all but 19,000 were restored by 25 April. Houses were flooded in Saint-Louis. Numerous schools sustained wind and flood damage. Officials estimated at least €7 million (US$8.26 million) in damage occurred to agriculture and that €4.5 million (US$5.3 million) would be needed to repair roadways. The road to Cilaos and the RN 5 highway were closed due to damage. The RN 5 highway was partially reopened during 25–26 April. Business activity was disrupted in Cilaos, causing losses to entrepreneurs.

Dozens of homes were flooded in Saint-André and roadways turned into gullies. Mudslides damaged the Joseph-Bedier College in Saint-André, necessitating at least €2.5 million (US$3 million) in repairs. The playground was entirely flooded, and at least 40 classrooms were damaged by water, mud, and debris; at least 6 rooms were ruined. Staff worked to clean 36 of the classrooms. In that town, one farm lost two melon greenhouses worth €30,000 (US$35,300) collectively, and 3,000 square metres (32,000 sq ft) of chilli fields were destroyed. Power and water supplies were cut to many homes in Saint-André. Although electricity had been restored in high voltage lines, a borehole was still offline, leaving at least half the homes in the area without water. Pipelines were damaged in Bras Citronnier. A fence was blown down by strong winds and lights were damaged at the Libra soccer field. A swimming pool filled up with mud and a gymnasium was inundated by water, with the latter resulting in damage to gym equipment. At one property, a home's wall and a retaining wall were destroyed, and a septic tank was lifted away by floodwaters. At another house, a generator was washed away and a steel gate was damaged. Floodwaters also washed a car into a ravine.

In Sainte-Rose, a farmer who produced 80,000 bananas per week suffered large losses. Another farmer lost 150 metric tons (170 short tons) of tomato plants. Banana and palm kernel crops were also crippled at the latter farm. Schools were closed on 26 April in the Saint-Pierre Municipality as a result of damage. In Sainte-Suzanne, dormitories and classrooms at the Hippolyte Foucque college experienced flood damage, resulting in classes being canceled on 25 April. Houses were surrounded by water, and a stall and parking lot were flooded near the Niagara Waterfall. Floodwaters formed a small island out of sediment and dead plant matter near the waterfall. On the same day, schools and daycares were closed in Saint-Joseph, St. Benedict, Port, St. Andrew, St. Paul, and Sainte-Suzanne. Extracurricular activities were also canceled in multiple cities. In St. Paul, schools and nurseries sustained damage, roadways were blocked, and access to water was cut.

The storm deroofed multiple residences and garages and downed electrical cables in St-Philippe. The Anse des Cascades was closed to tourists after dozens of trees were felled. At least 40 canoes and small craft were either damaged or destroyed in Sainte-Rose during the storm. One person had to be rescued after he fell into the water. Two of the vessels were unusable and another eleven required replacement engines or other repairs. Damage sustained by those thirteen ships was estimated to be €140,000 (US$165,000). The roofs and plexiglass of agricultural buildings were blown away by strong winds in Grand-Ilet. Twenty farms suffered damage during the storm, including one that lost at least 1,500 chickens. Locker rooms at a football field sustained damage, and the Bois-de-Pommes school was inundated by floodwaters. The church of Salazie village was further damaged. A potato field in the Plaine des Cafres region was destroyed by heavy rainfall. Sugar cane production across the island was significantly decreased by the storm. Total damage across the island exceeded €15 million (US$17.7 million).

=== Mauritius ===
A Class II cyclone warning was issued for the island of Mauritius at 10 p.m. local time on 23 April, while Fakir was 510 km (320 mi) to the northwest. Schools, universities, and preschools were closed on 24 April. Fakir passed 130 km (81 mi) west-southwest of Le Morne Brabant at about 10 a.m. on 24 April, representing its closest approach to the island. Gusty winds and moderate rain were recorded on Mauritius. The highest gust in relation to Fakir was 112 km/h (70 mph) at Beaux-Songes, and a peak 24-hour rainfall total of 105 mm (4.1 in) was recorded at Riche-en-Eau. The cyclone warning was lifted on the afternoon of 24 April as Fakir raced off to the south. Damage on the island was limited to fallen trees and street flooding in the southern and western regions. About 280 households lost electricity as power lines were damaged by fallen trees. Firefighters and members of the Special Mobile Force were deployed 32 times to help clear roads and conduct rescues. Damage to crops caused by the rains resulted in an increase in the prices of vegetables by 20 percent in the week following Fakir.

== Aftermath ==
At least 360 firefighters conducted at least 253 operations on 24 April, including 5 rescues. Around triple the amount of plant waste was collected during a one-month period after the storm. At least 559 cases for emergency aid had been approved, totaling €226,930 (US$267,131). At least four months following Fakir, most of the fishermen in Sainte-Rose were unable to return to sea due to a lack of funds to repair their damaged vessels.

After Fakir, MP David Lorion requested that the Réunion Prefecture Government and the Minister of the Overseas establish a disaster relief fund to repair damage sustained from tropical cyclones throughout the 2017–18 season. Similarly, the mayor of Sainte-Suzanne requested an emergency meeting be called for the Association of Mayors of Reunion Island to find solutions for problems caused by the numerous tropical cyclones during the year. A disaster declaration was issued for 15 municipalities as a result of agricultural losses during Fakir, including Les Avirons, Bras-Panon, L'Entre-Deux, L'Étang-Salé, Petite-Île, Saint André, Saint-Benoît, Saint-Joseph, Saint-Leu, Saint-Louis, Saint-Pierre, Saint Philippe, Sainte-Marie, Sainte-Rose, and Sainte-Suzanne. Many farms were destroyed, with some requiring up to a year for repairs. Crop shortages occurred following the storm, with some farms struggling to recover. Work began to cleanup the Anse des Cascades in July. Over 2 hectares (4.9 acres), including at least 100 trees, had to be pruned. Power lines and trees covered the access road to the tourist attraction. No repair work had commenced a month post-storm. Damage in the area was estimated at €160,000 (US$188,300), with €70,000 (US$82,400) occurring at the tourist attraction. A large, 15 metric tons (17 short tons) banyan was 75 percent straightened months after Fakir. After five successive cyclones affected the island, the Communist Party of Réunion held meetings to discuss reforming construction standards and reassess areas under risk.

The Réunion Departmental Council voted to disperse €2.3 million (US$2.7 million) in aid to farmers in May 2018. In August, the Tampon city council distributed 160 metric tons (180 short tons) of fertilizer to 155 farmers to aid in recovery efforts. The banks of the Saint Jean river in Sainte-Suzanne and Saint-André were damaged during the storm. Work took place in February 2019 to repair the shore in Saint-André, however, no repair work occurred for the shoreline in Sainte-Suzanne. Residents sought legal action, expressing concern that the work impeded their properties because it caused a deviation in the river that directed it towards their homes. A small protest broke out in Pamplemousses, Mauritius, over alleged failure by the authorities to hand out allowances to disaster victims. At least €6.1 million (US$7.2 million) in funds were provided to add a drainage network to the Chemin Stéphane highway in March 2019, following the flooding caused by cyclones Berguitta and Fakir.

Multiple crops were severely damaged during the storm, such as bananas, potatoes, and vegetables. A combination of disease and the damage caused by Fakir resulted in a 70-percent cut to banana production. Bananas cost an average of €1 (US$1.2) more per 1 kg (2.2 lb) for at least six months after the storm. Prices in some areas were double or triple the normal rate. The FDSEA organization in Saint-André offered €25 (US$29) in aid per 1 m^{2} (11 sq ft) of land for farmers who suffered losses after Fakir. The prefecture promised at least €2,000 (US$2,400) per 1 hectare (2.5 acres) in relief funds for farmers affected by tropical cyclones during the 2017–18 season. The city of Saint-Leu set up a service to provide aid to uninsured people in June 2018. The service provided compensation for 30 percent of the losses experienced.

== See also ==
- Weather of 2017 and 2018
- Tropical cyclones in 2017 and 2018
- Tropical cyclones in the Mascarene Islands
