= Cyclone Berguitta =

South-West Indian Ocean cyclone of the 2017–18 season

Intense Tropical Cyclone Berguitta
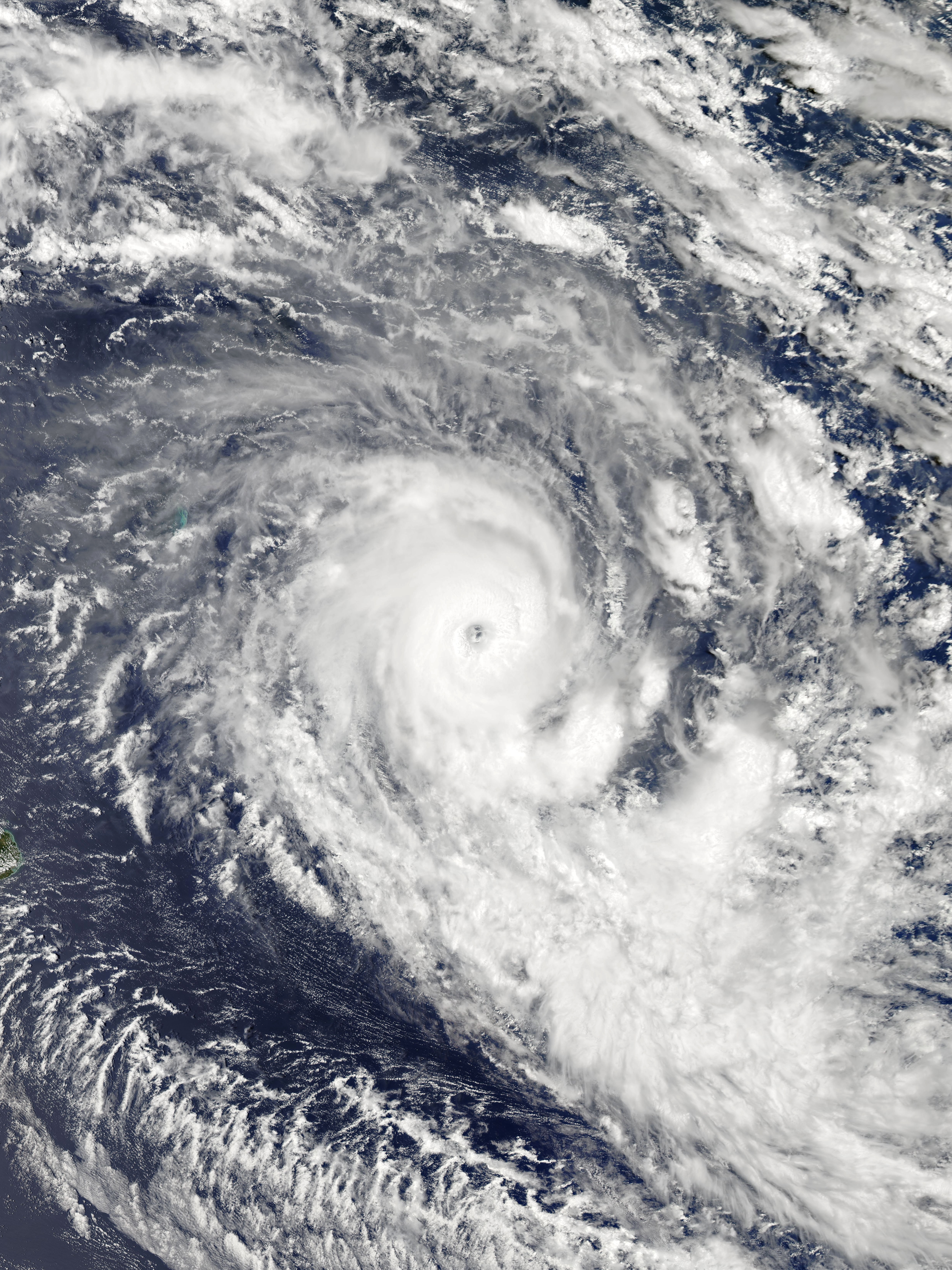
- Berguitta near peak intensity on 15 January north of Rodrigues

Meteorological history
- Formed: 11 January 2018
- Post-tropical: 19 January 2018
- Dissipated: 24 January 2018

Intense tropical cyclone
- 10-minute sustained (MF)
- Highest winds: 165 km/h (105 mph)
- Highest gusts: 230 km/h (145 mph)
- Lowest pressure: 960 hPa (mbar); 28.35 inHg

Category 3-equivalent tropical cyclone
- 1-minute sustained (SSHWS/JTWC)
- Highest winds: 195 km/h (120 mph)
- Lowest pressure: 950 hPa (mbar); 28.05 inHg

Overall effects
- Fatalities: 2
- Missing: 1
- Economic losses: $107 million (2018 USD)
- Areas affected: Mauritius, Réunion
- IBTrACS
- Part of the 2017–18 South-West Indian Ocean cyclone season

Intense Tropical Cyclone Berguitta was a strong tropical cyclone that caused flooding in Mauritius and Réunion in January 2018. The third tropical system and first intense tropical cyclone of the 2017–18 South-West Indian Ocean cyclone season, Berguitta originated from an area of scattered thunderstorms southwest of the Chagos Archipelago on 10 January. It slowly organised as it moved southwards, and became a tropical storm as it turned west on 13 January. Berguitta then rapidly intensified to achieve its peak intensity on 15 January while stalling north of Rodrigues. At the time, the cyclone possessed 10-minute sustained winds of 165 km/h (105 mph), 1-minute sustained winds of 195 km/h (120 mph), and a minimum central pressure of 960 hPa (28.35 inHg). Berguitta weakened as it moved slowly west-southwestwards on 16 January, and the cyclone degraded to a tropical storm by 17 January. It accelerated southwestwards over Mauritius and Réunion on 18 January, before degenerating to a post-tropical cyclone the next day. The remnants of Berguitta transitioned into an extratropical cyclone and dissipated over the Indian Ocean on 24 January.

In Mauritius, Berguitta brought heavy rains and gusty winds to Rodrigues from 13 to 15 January. The island experienced a quarter of its average annual rainfall during those three days, resulting in widespread floods, especially in coastal areas. The island's airport was closed for nearly six days, stranding several Mauritians and tourists. Berguitta affected Mauritius's main island on 17 and 18 January, passing just south of the coast. Two days of continuous heavy rain caused severe floods that damaged buildings and at least three‑quarters of the island's crops. A total of 6,800 households lost power after fallen trees damaged power lines, while water supplies to the capital Port Louis were disrupted. Two people were killed on Mauritius: one in a car crash and the other after a fall from a ladder. After the storm, the government gave payouts to 13,000 affected residents, but the small size of the payments and delays in giving them out led to protests. More demonstrations ensued when families were evicted from evacuation centres. Economic losses in Mauritius were estimated at ₨ 2 billion (US$59 million). (Note: All currencies are in their 2018 values and are converted to United States dollars using data from the International Monetary Fund published by the World Bank.)

Réunion was impacted by rain and wind mostly on 18 January. The southern part of the island was particularly hard-hit by floods and landslides. Several rainfall records set by previous cyclones were broken, particularly at Grande Coude, which experienced 1,862 mm (73.3 in) of rain in eight days, including 848 mm (33.4 in) in 24 hours. Widespread rain-induced flooding caused extensive damage to road infrastructure and agriculture. One person went missing after being swept away by floodwaters. Damage to the power grid left nearly 100,000 customers without electricity, while water supplies were interrupted in several communes. Economic losses in Réunion were estimated at €41 million (US$48 million), including €16.7 million (US$19.7 million) of agricultural damage. The town of Cilaos was especially affected after the only road linking it to the island's ports was blocked repeatedly by landslides, severely disrupting economic activity. After Berguitta passed, the government invested several million euros into reconstruction, financial aid, and improving road infrastructure. However, recovery was interrupted by cyclones Dumazile and Fakir in March and April, respectively.

== Meteorological history ==
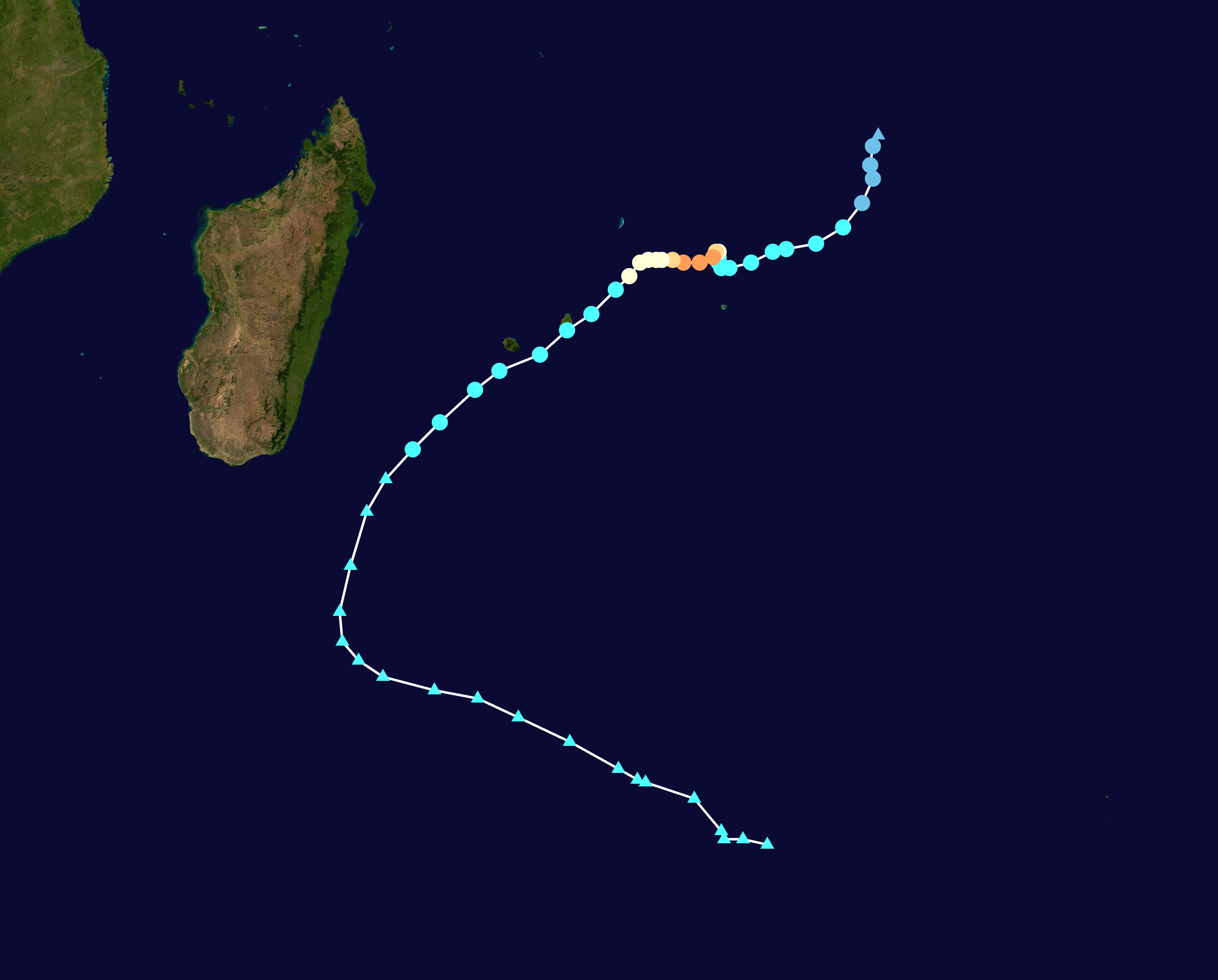
Map plotting the storm's track and intensity, according to the Saffir–Simpson scale Map key Saffir–Simpson scale Tropical depression (≤38 mph, ≤62 km/h) Tropical storm (39–73 mph, 63–118 km/h) Category 1 (74–95 mph, 119–153 km/h) Category 2 (96–110 mph, 154–177 km/h) Category 3 (111–129 mph, 178–208 km/h) Category 4 (130–156 mph, 209–251 km/h) Category 5 (≥157 mph, ≥252 km/h) Unknown Storm type Tropical cyclone Subtropical cyclone Extratropical cyclone, remnant low, tropical disturbance, or monsoon depression

A zone of disturbed weather formed within the monsoon trough southwest of the Chagos Archipelago on 10 January. As the remnants of nearby cyclones Ava and Irving moved south of the Tropic of Capricorn, the surrounding environment became generally conducive to tropical cyclogenesis, with increased convergence of surface air flows and reduced easterly wind shear. Consequently, the disturbance's center of circulation became better defined as it moved south-southwest. At 12:00 UTC on 11 January, Météo-France La Réunion (MFR)—the Regional Specialised Meteorological Centre for the South-West Indian Ocean—classified the system as a tropical disturbance, the third of the 2017–18 South-West Indian Ocean cyclone season. At the same time, the Joint Typhoon Warning Center (JTWC) identified the system as a tropical depression. (Note: While not designated by the World Meteorological Organization as a Regional Specialised Meteorological Centre, the JTWC issues warnings on tropical cyclones in all of the major tropical cyclone basins to supplement the activities of United States government agencies.) An intrusion of dry air on the system's western flank slowed development overnight from 11 to 12 January, before a large burst of thunderstorm activity over the system's center allowed it to consolidate further. The MFR classified the system as a tropical depression at 00:00 UTC on 13 January, then upgraded it further to Moderate Tropical Storm Berguitta six hours later.

Berguitta slowly strengthened on 13 and 14 January as it began to develop a central dense overcast. During that time, a ridge strengthening south of Madagascar caused the storm to turn west then northwest while decelerating. Rapid development began by 15 January while Berguitta became nearly stationary, with the MFR and the JTWC both noting the system to have reached tropical cyclone intensity early that day. Amid high oceanic heat content and low vertical wind shear, an eye quickly formed within the small system. Berguitta reached its maximum strength at 12:00 UTC on 15 January, with the MFR estimating 10-minute sustained winds of 165 km/h (105 mph), gusts reaching 230 km/h (145 mph), and a central pressure of 960 hPa (28.35 inHg). This made Berguitta the season's first intense tropical cyclone on the MFR's scale. Simultaneously, the JTWC estimated peak 1-minute sustained winds of 195 km/h (120 mph). The cyclone's intensity levelled off thereafter, with little further change in the cloud pattern noted on satellite imagery. Berguitta started to drift west-southwestwards later on 15 January as the aforementioned ridge steering the cyclone started weakening.

Pronounced weakening commenced on 16 January, caused by dry air in Berguitta's northwest quadrant entraining into its circulation and eroding the eastern eyewall. The eye collapsed as the central dense overcast warmed and lost symmetry, leading the MFR to declare Berguitta had degraded to a severe tropical storm at 18:00 UTC. On 17 January, a new ridge developing to Berguitta's east began to steer the system southwest, while causing an increase in northeasterly wind shear. Consequently, further slow weakening occurred, and the MFR assessed that Berguitta's winds bottomed out at 75 km/h (45 mph) as it moved through the Mascarene Islands. For the next day or two, Berguitta's structure and intensity remained relatively unchanged, with scatterometer data indicating winds stayed between 75–85 km/h (45–50 mph). Afterwards, as Berguitta tracked further south, decreasing oceanic heat content caused the cyclone's cloud pattern to lose organisation. The MFR declared the system post-tropical at 18:00 UTC on 19 January as it began accelerating southwards, pulled by an upper-level trough to its southeast. Thunderstorm activity became increasingly limited on 20 January, and the JTWC assessed that Berguitta had transitioned to an extratropical cyclone by 18:00 UTC. The remnants of Berguitta decelerated and turned east-southeast over the next few days while maintaining gale-force winds, even deepening slightly on 21 January. The system soon resumed weakening, however, and was last noted by the MFR near 40°S 65°E on 24 January.

== Effects in Mauritius ==
=== Rodrigues ===
As Berguitta developed north of Rodrigues, a Class I cyclone warning was issued for the island on 13 January. This was upgraded to a Class II cyclone warning on 14 January as Berguitta strengthened and moved closer to Rodrigues. From 13 to 15 January, Rodrigues experienced gusty winds and heavy rain. A 108 km/h (67 mph) wind gust was recorded in Patate-Théophile on Rodrigues's east coast, and a gust to 102 km/h (63 mph) was observed in Pointe-Canon along the island's north coast. The island received a quarter of its average annual rainfall in those three days, with a peak rainfall total of 320 mm (13 in) in Citronelle. A total of 25 people on the island sought shelter in evacuation centres. Coastal roads were inundated and made impassable. Firefighters responded to more than 40 incidents, most of which were flood-related, and the Special Mobile Force was deployed to cut down three trees that collapsed onto electrical cables. The adverse weather caused Sir Gaëtan Duval Airport in Plaine-Corail to close from 13 January, leading Air Mauritius to cancel flights to the island. This left 50 Mauritians and tourists stranded. All cyclone warnings in Rodrigues were lifted on 15 January as Berguitta moved away from the island, though torrential rain continued to affect Rodrigues until 17 January. Residents of Rodrigues were given a day off from work by the local government on 16 January, as some obstructed roads had yet to be cleared. Sir Gaëtan Duval Airport eventually reopened in the evening of 18 January, allowing those stranded to leave the island.

=== Mauritius Island ===
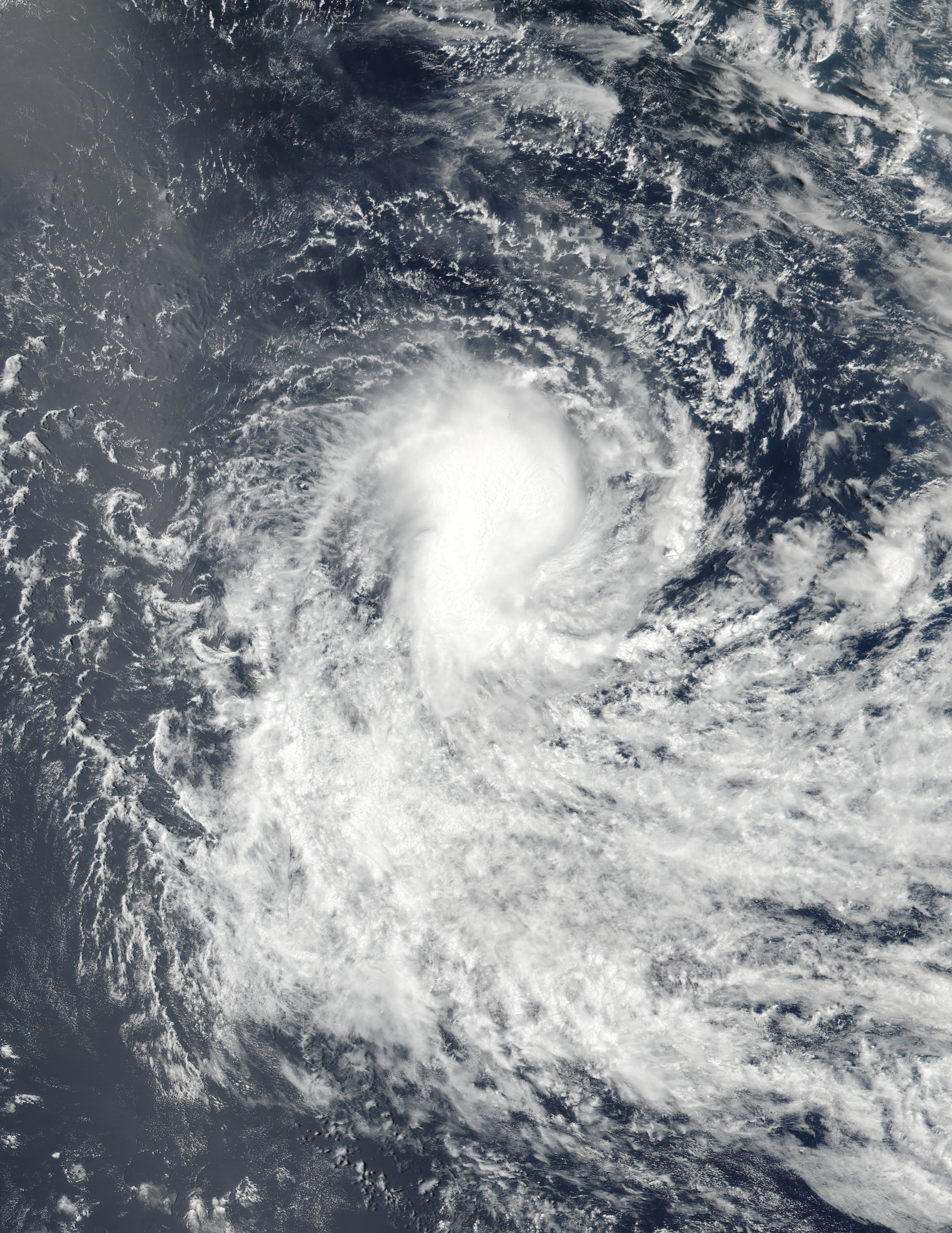
Berguitta beginning to affect Mauritius on 17 January

==== Preparations and impact ====
While Berguitta moved away from Rodrigues, it turned towards the main island of Mauritius, leading authorities to issue a Class I cyclone warning for the island on the afternoon of 15 January. This was raised to a Class II cyclone warning on the morning of 16 January, and further upgraded to Class III just 24 hours later. The MFR originally expected the centre of Berguitta to pass directly over the island; the cyclone eventually passed 15 km (9 mi) off the coast of Souillac. Berguitta's predicted trajectory and intensity generated comparisons to 1994's Cyclone Hollanda and 2002's Cyclone Dina. Schools were closed from the morning of 16 January, and the National Disaster Risk Reduction and Management Centre announced that workplaces would be closed and workers placed on mandatory leave beginning on 17 January. Sir Seewoosagur Ramgoolam International Airport was closed until further notice on the morning of 17 January, leading Air Mauritius to cancel its flights and other international airlines to reschedule theirs. The State Bank of Mauritius disabled its automated teller machines from the evening of 16 January. The Judiciary of Mauritius postponed 2,512 trials scheduled for 17 and 18 January. Authorities opened 172 evacuation centres across the island; a total of 4,043 people sought shelter in 79 of these centres on 17 and 18 January. Demand was greatest in the capital Port Louis, where an additional centre had to be set up on the spot. At these centres, evacuees were provided with water, hot meals, snacks, and mattresses.

Two fatalities occurred in Mauritius due to Berguitta: a woman died in a road traffic accident on 17 January when her husband lost control of their car, and a man died on 23 January after suffering a head injury on 17 January when falling off a ladder. Heavy rain fell almost continuously from the afternoon of 17 January till the morning of 18 January; the highest recorded rainfall accumulation was 229.6 mm (9.04 in) at Mare-aux-Vacoas. The highest observed wind gusts were 83 km/h (52 mph), at multiple locations along the island's southwest coast. Flooding occurred in many parts of the island, exacerbated by a high water table after rains from Cyclone Ava earlier in the month. Blocked drains caused by improper waste disposal and concrete walls that obstructed surface runoff were also blamed for intensifying floods. Firefighters responded to nearly 200 distress calls on the morning of 17 January and another 106 overnight from 17 to 18 January, including at least three instances where people had to be rescued from rising floodwaters. Fallen trees and branches knocked down power cables, causing 6,800 households to lose power. Roads were made impassable by fallen trees or floods in at least 22 places. The Riverland Sports Club in Tamarin was severely damaged by floodwaters after a river 300 m (980 ft) away burst its banks. Water supplies to Port Louis were disrupted on the morning of 18 January after mud clogged filters at a water treatment plant. Agriculture on the island suffered significantly, with 75 to 80 percent of crops destroyed. Consequently, production of vegetables fell below 1,000 metric tons (1,100 short tons) per week, well under the average countrywide rate of vegetable consumption at 2,600 metric tons (2,900 short tons) a week. This led to a shortage of vegetables on the island, and vegetable prices were expected to rise by 20 to 25 percent.

==== Aftermath ====
The cyclone warnings for Mauritius Island were lifted by 18 January as Berguitta moved away. Prime Minister of Mauritius, Pravind Jugnauth, visited affected areas on 18 January; he narrowly escaped being crushed by a fallen tree while his car was leaving Bel Air. Sir Seewoosagur Ramgoolam International Airport reopened on the evening of 18 January. Soldiers from the Special Mobile Force and firefighters were deployed to clear roads blocked by flooding or fallen trees. Technicians from the Central Electricity Board were sent to restore electrical services, and they reduced the number of households without power to 375 by 19 January. Schools remained closed on 19 January while the Ministry of Education assessed the situation and conducted repairs; they reopened the following Monday, 22 January, with the exception of one primary school which reopened a day later instead. To address the shortage of vegetables, measures were taken to import carrots, green beans, cauliflower, and cabbages from South Africa, India, and Egypt, to be sold at cost price to make them more affordable. In a further attempt to reduce costs, a deal was negotiated with Saudia to fly vegetables from Egypt three times a week for free, beginning in February. The extent of improper waste disposal in Mauritius was highlighted by Berguitta, with 957 metric tons (1,055 short tons) of litter collected from Mauritius's beaches after having been washed ashore by the cyclone.

After Berguitta's passage, 13,000 residents of Mauritius registered with authorities to receive payouts of ₨ 175 (about US$5) per day to cover food and accommodation expenses. The government reported that ₨ 2.5 million (US$74,000) had been distributed to victims of Berguitta by 20 January. However, discrepancies in the amount of money given to each person, delays in receiving the payouts, and a general sentiment that the size of each payout was too small generated discontent among victims, culminating in protests outside Pope Hennessy and Terre-Rouge police stations in Port Louis on 19 January. Farmers were given ₨ 3,500 (US$100) worth of seeds per acre to restart their plantations. However, this too was seen as insufficient, particularly by small-scale plantation owners. The eventual sum of money invested by the government into agricultural relief was about ₨ 14 million (US$410,000). The Prime Minister's Office called on the public and private sectors to contribute to the Prime Minister's Cyclone Relief Fund, since it was expected that repair works across the island would be too costly for the government to fund alone. Responding to the call, local real estate company Mont Choisy Group, Mauritius Housing Company, and the Government of the People's Republic of China each donated ₨ 1 million (US$29,000) to the fund. Saudi Arabia donated US$20 million to the country to fund infrastructure projects, half of which was designated for post-Berguitta reconstruction. The Mauritius Red Cross Society came up with an action plan to support 600 households affected by Berguitta, but the government declined their assistance in favour of drawing from the Prime Minister's Cyclone Relief Fund and utilising foreign aid. A donation drive was organised by Courts Singapore and Mistral on 22 February, where families affected by Berguitta received various household appliances. Although most people in the evacuation centres left once they had settled repairs to their homes, several families in the town of St. Malo who had lost their homes entirely remained. Despite claiming that the government had promised to provide them housing, they did not receive any updates until they were evicted from the centre on July 17. After petitioning the government through hunger strikes and demonstrations, they were eventually given alternative accommodation until their new houses finished construction in October.

Former director of Mauritius Meteorological Services, Subiraj Sok Appadu, labelled Berguitta as a "wake-up call" for Mauritius to better handle cyclones and climate change, and estimated the disruption caused by Berguitta would result in Mauritian gross domestic product decreasing by 1.5 to 2 percent—roughly ₨ 6–8 billion (US$180–240 million). Local economist Eric Ng estimated that the cessation of economic activity from 17 to 18 January would result in losses of ₨ 2 billion (US$59 million). The textile industry alone lost ₨ 200 million (US$5.9 million) of revenue due to factory closures, as gauged by the chief executive officer of local clothing manufacturer Star Knitwear. While severe, damage in Mauritius was not as bad as initially expected, owing to Berguitta's swift movement through the country.

== Effects in Réunion ==
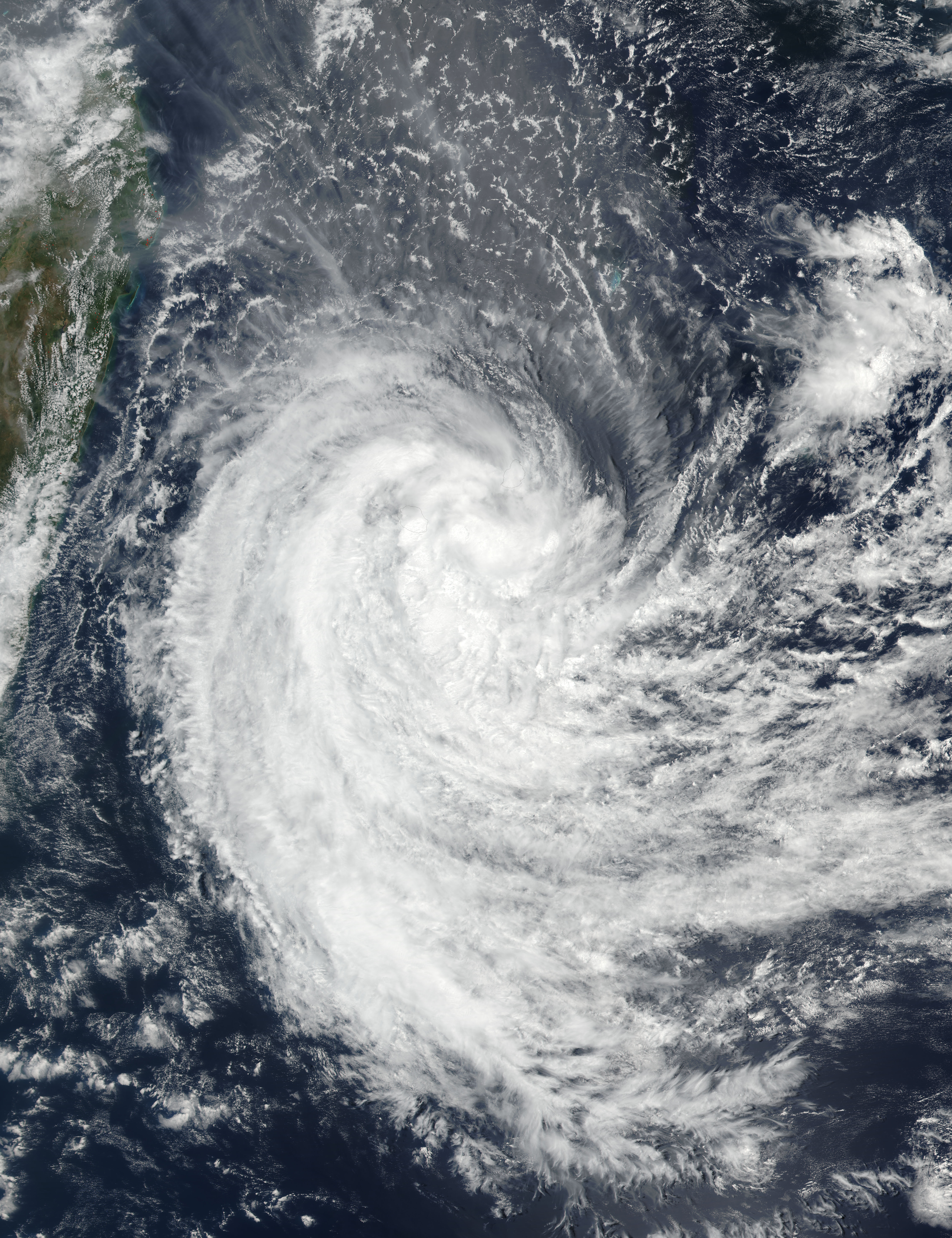
Berguitta southeast of Réunion on 18 January

=== Preparations ===
Réunion was placed on pre-alert at noon on 15 January while Berguitta was still 855 km (530 mi) east-northeast of the island. Panic buying at supermarkets began as soon as 14 January, as initial forecasts by the MFR depicted Berguitta passing close to or over Réunion. Shelves were quickly emptied of water and canned food while long queues formed outside supermarkets, causing frustration among some Réunionese. Several public facilities and tourist attractions, such as public swimming pools, museums, and parks, were closed from 16 January as the weather deteriorated. Électricité de France readied its staff and equipment for addressing potential damage to the power grid. Several airlines, including Air Austral, Air France, Corsair, XL Airways, Air Mauritius, and French Blue, modified their flight schedules from 16 January to avoid the bad weather.

The alert level was raised to orange on 17 January, allowing the opening of evacuation shelters across the island. The University of Reunion Island closed its campus from the afternoon of 17 January till the morning of 22 January. Roland Garros Airport closed in the evening of 17 January until the morning of 19 January. Boaters at the ports of Sainte-Marie and Saint-Gilles were forbidden to go out to sea by the Chamber of Commerce and Industry. The red alert was controversially not issued due to a lack of recorded hurricane-force winds, even as rainfall over the island grew more intense and conditions became more hazardous. At the same time, authorities enacted increasingly stringent preventive measures more characteristic of a red alert.

=== Impact ===
Réunion was buffeted by heavy rains and gusty winds on most of 18 January as Berguitta passed 55 km (35 mi) east-southeast of the island. A peak gust of 144 km/h (89 mph) was observed in Gros-Piton, Sainte-Rose on the morning of 18 January. Intense torrential rainfall occurred over the island beginning late on 17 January, though the influence of Berguitta's circulation generated rain on the island as early as 11 January. The highest rainfall in Réunion occurred at Grand Coude, Saint-Joseph, with a 24-hour rainfall total of 848 mm (33.4 in), a 48-hour total of 981 mm (38.6 in), and an eight-day total from 11 to 18 January of 1,862 mm (73.3 in). These all broke location-specific records for rainfall previously held by cyclones Connie, Hollanda, and Hyacinthe, a pattern observed in several other places in the south and southwest parts of Réunion. With soils already near or at saturation because of heavy rains from Cyclone Ava from 2 to 8 January, the addition of intense rainfall from Berguitta caused significant flooding all over Réunion, particularly in the south of the island. Roads were obstructed by fallen trees and landslides while bridges were washed out by swollen rivers; the communes of Le Port, Le Tampon, and Saint-Leu issued traffic bans amid the perilous driving conditions. The Route du Littoral and the Route de Cilaos highways were severely damaged and obstructed by debris. Bassin Plat in Saint-Pierre was completely inundated as the nearby Rivière d'Abord burst its banks, forcing several hundred of the town's inhabitants to evacuate. A cemetery in Saint-Leu was flooded, along with nearby houses. Amid the widespread flooding, the gendarmerie, police, firefighters, and French Army soldiers conducted a total of 190 interventions during the storm and rescued 86 people. One person in L'Étang-Salé went missing after being swept away by floodwaters. Fallen trees damaged power lines in many places, leaving up to 100,000 customers of Électricité de France without power. The whole of Saint-Joseph and Saint-Philippe lost access to potable water. Smaller disruptions to water supplies were felt in Entre-Deux, Les Avirons, Le Tampon, and Saint-Louis. Along Réunion's western coast, large waves from Berguitta contributed to severe coastal erosion, and washed up thousands of sea urchins along the beaches of Petit Boucan in Saint-Gilles. Floods from Berguitta swept out minerals and waste into the lagoon off Saint-Leu, contributing to mass coral deaths.

The agricultural sector suffered significant damage as the heavy rains caused landslides and oversaturated the soil, destroying crops and resulting in some agricultural grounds becoming unusable. A chicken farm in Saint-Joseph recorded losses of €80,000 (US$94,000) after 13,700 of its 14,000 chickens drowned. A farmer in Le Tampon lost 50,000 pineapple plants worth €45,000 (US$53,000)—almost his entire plantation. Another 290 hectares (720 acres) of vegetable crops in the commune were destroyed. Across the island, about 90 km (55 mi) of logging roads were washed away by floods and landslides. About 200 beehives were washed away and another 200 cattle died. Damage to agriculture in Réunion was at least €16.7 million (US$19.7 million). Overall economic losses across the island were estimated at €41 million (US$48 million), including €2.5–3 million (US$3.0–3.5 million) of damage in L'Étang-Salé, €2 million (US$2.4 million) in Saint-Philippe, and €8 million (US$9.5 million) in Petite-Île.

=== Aftermath ===
The orange alert was lifted by 19 January as Berguitta moved away from Réunion and weakened, allowing damage assessments to begin and repairs to be made. Électricité de France mobilised five teams, over a hundred technicians, and four helicopters to assess and repair damage to the power grid. Four hundred packages of bottled water were airlifted to Saint-Louis by helicopter to address water shortages. The Réunion Departmental Council announced they would invest €20 million (US$24 million) into reconstruction efforts, and allocated an additional €5 million (US$5.9 million) to road infrastructure in the yearly budget. Businesses affected by Berguitta received payouts between €500 and €1500 (US$590 and US$1,800) as compensation for their losses. A state of natural disaster was recognised in the communes of Cilaos, Entre-Deux, L'Étang-Salé, Le Tampon, Les Avirons, Petite-Île, Saint-Joseph, Saint-Leu, Saint-Louis, and Saint-Pierre on 30 January, and in Saint-Philippe on 21 February. This would allow the communes to submit claims to their insurers to reduce the cost of damage. The Ministry of the Overseas, based in Metropolitan France, granted Réunion access to the Overseas Relief Fund on 6 February as a "show of national solidarity".

The town of Cilaos was left cut off for several weeks as constant rockfalls and landslides during and after Berguitta repeatedly blocked the Route de Cilaos, the only road from Cilaos to the coast and its ports. Economic activity in the town thus came to a standstill, placing up to 1,500 jobs under threat. A project was initiated to rebuild bridges across the Saint-Etienne River by temporarily damming it, with costs estimated at over €100 million (US$120 million). To support affected businesses, in early February, authorities allocated a €2 million (US$2.4 million) budget for financial aid. An additional €300,000 (US$350,000) from an emergency relief fund was promised, but delays in distributing the funds sparked a protest by business owners outside the Chamber of Commerce and Industry office in Saint-Pierre on 12 March. Another €600,000 (US$710,000) was given to affected companies in Cilaos and Grand Bassin, Le Tampon in late March.

Réunion's recovery following Berguitta was disrupted in early March by Cyclone Dumazile. Newly planted crops were destroyed by Dumazile's winds and rains and some soils became unusable for agriculture after being further waterlogged, leading to shortages of fruits and vegetables once again. Works on repairing the Route de Cilaos were paused partly due to Dumazile's passage, angering residents of Cilaos. Recovery efforts were set back even further in April when Cyclone Fakir produced similar effects to Berguitta. The similar situations experienced during Berguitta and Fakir, where rainfall instead of wind was the main threat, led to a redesign of cyclone warnings on Réunion. Rainfall intensity could now be a trigger for warnings, and a new "purple alert" was added to reflect exceptionally dangerous conditions.

== See also ==
- Weather of 2017 and 2018
- Tropical cyclones in 2017 and 2018
- Tropical cyclones in the Mascarene Islands
