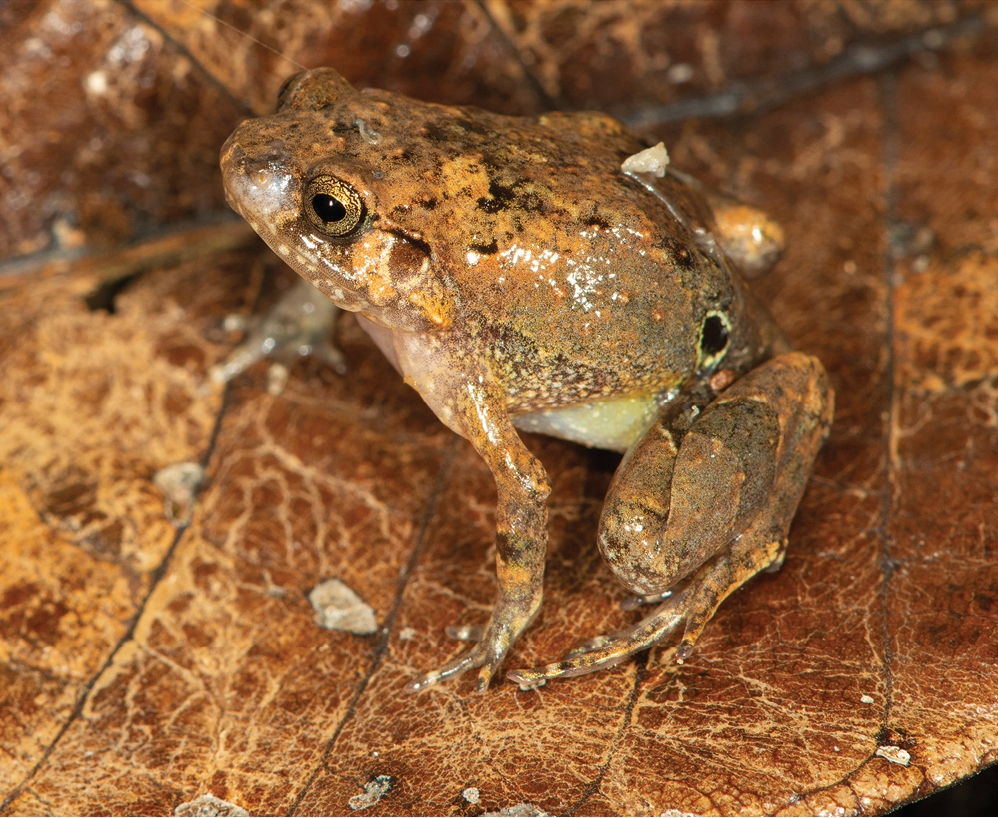
- A Rhombophryne ellae frog on leaf litter

Scientific classification
- Kingdom: Animalia
- Phylum: Chordata
- Class: Amphibia
- Order: Anura
- Family: Microhylidae
- Subfamily: Cophylinae
- Genus: Rhombophryne
- Species: R. ellae

Binomial name
- Rhombophryne ellae Scherz, 2020

= Rhombophryne ellae =

Species of amphibian

Rhombophryne ellae is a species of frog in the family Microhylidae. It is endemic to Montagne d'Ambre National Park in the northern Madagascar. The species was discovered soon after it was possibly forced out of its habitat by Cyclone Ava.
