= Tropical Storm Eliakim =

South-West Indian Ocean severe tropical storm in 2018

Severe Tropical Storm Eliakim
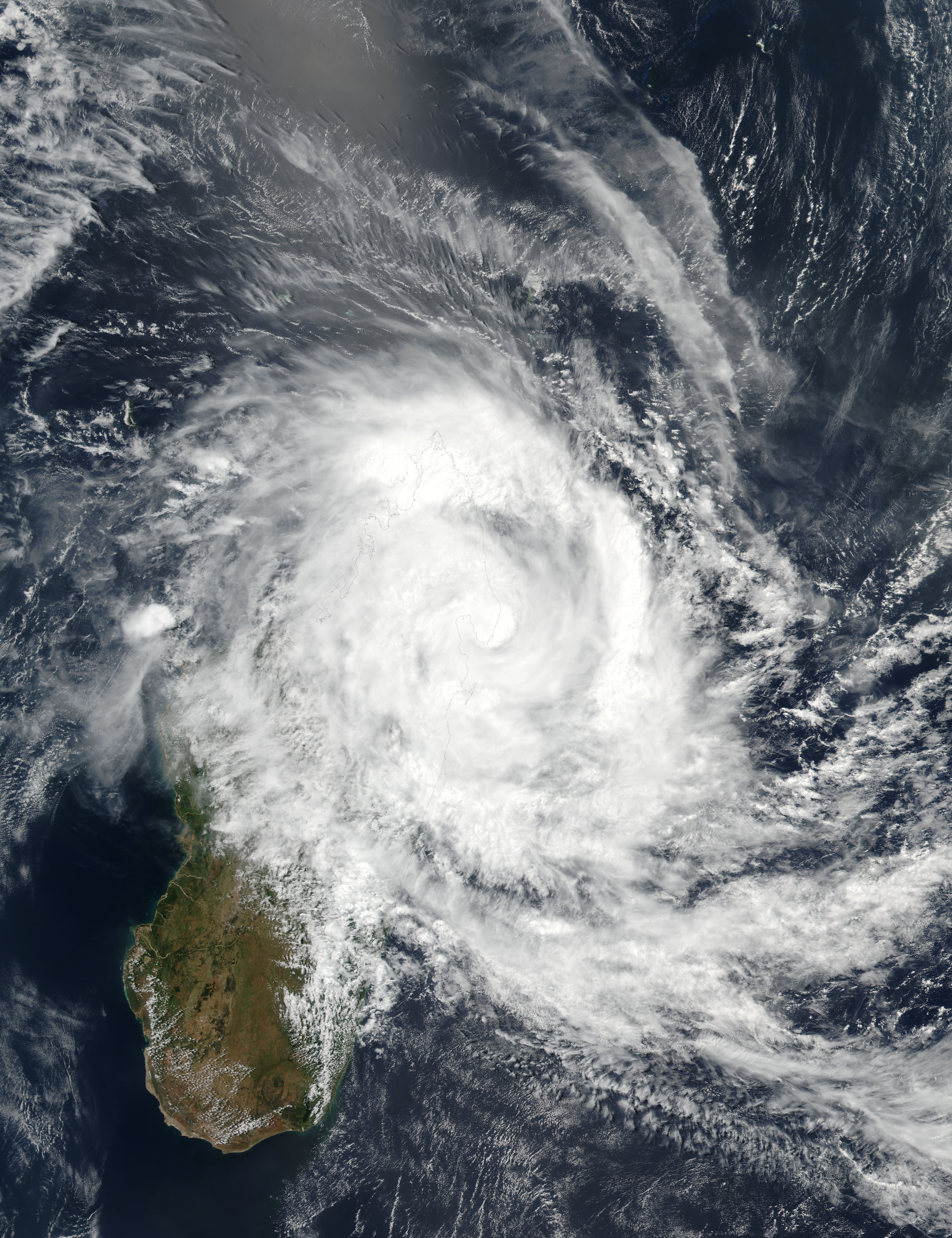
- Eliakim at peak intensity on 16 March

Meteorological history
- Formed: 14 March 2018
- Post-tropical: 20 March 2018
- Dissipated: 22 March 2018

Severe tropical storm
- 10-minute sustained (MF)
- Highest winds: 110 km/h (70 mph)
- Highest gusts: 155 km/h (100 mph)
- Lowest pressure: 980 hPa (mbar); 28.94 inHg

Category 1-equivalent tropical cyclone
- 1-minute sustained (SSHWS/JTWC)
- Highest winds: 120 km/h (75 mph)
- Lowest pressure: 982 hPa (mbar); 29.00 inHg

Overall effects
- Fatalities: 21 total
- Damage: $3.21 million (2018 USD)
- Areas affected: Madagascar, Réunion, Mayotte, Tromelin Island, Mauritius, Kenya
- IBTrACS
- Part of the 2017–18 South-West Indian Ocean cyclone season

Severe Tropical Storm Eliakim was a tropical cyclone that affected Madagascar and killed 21 people in 2018. The seventh tropical depression, sixth tropical storm of the 2017–18 South-West Indian Ocean cyclone season, and fourth tropical cyclone in 2018 to impact Madagascar, Eliakim was first noted as an area of atmospheric convection south-southwest of Diego Garcia on 9 March. Developmental conditions were favorable in its vicinity, and on 14 March, both the Joint Typhoon Warning Center (JTWC) and Météo-France La Réunion (MFR) began issuing warnings on the system, with MFR designating it as Tropical Disturbance 7 and the JTWC giving it the designation 14S. On the next day, MFR upgraded the system to a moderate tropical storm, assigning it the name Eliakim. Eliakim further intensified into a severe tropical storm on 15 March, with the JTWC upgrading it to a Category 1-equivalent cyclone on the Saffir–Simpson scale on 16 March. Eliakim made landfall on Masoala at 07:00 UTC, after which MFR estimated maximum 10-minute sustained winds of 110 km/h (70 mph) within the system. Eliakim weakened into a moderate tropical storm before abruptly turning southwards and re-emerging over water on 17 March. Despite unfavorable conditions, Eliakim re-intensified into a severe tropical storm on 19 March before being downgraded back into a moderate tropical storm 6 hours later. Eliakim transitioned into a post-tropical cyclone on 20 March as it moved away from Madagascar, with the MFR last tracking the system on 22 March.

The storm's outer bands first reached Madagascar on 15 March, and by 16 March, Eliakim made landfall on Madagascar. Thousands of people were evacuated in vulnerable areas, accompanied by advisories of heavy rainfall and strong winds. Flooding and heavy rainfall were observed in several regions, with a maximum of 388 millimeters (15.3 in) of rain being recorded in Île Sainte-Marie. Eliakim caused 21 fatalities in Madagascar, affected another 60,000, and displaced 19,439 people. Structures were also affected, with 17,228 homes, 15 roads, 27 health facilities, and 1,118 classrooms experiencing damage. Rehabilitation works in the country were estimated to cost 10 billion Malagasy ariary (US$3.21 million). Other countries also sustained impacts, with Réunion receiving swells of 5–6 meters (16–20 ft) and parts of Kenya experiencing flooding.

== Meteorological history ==
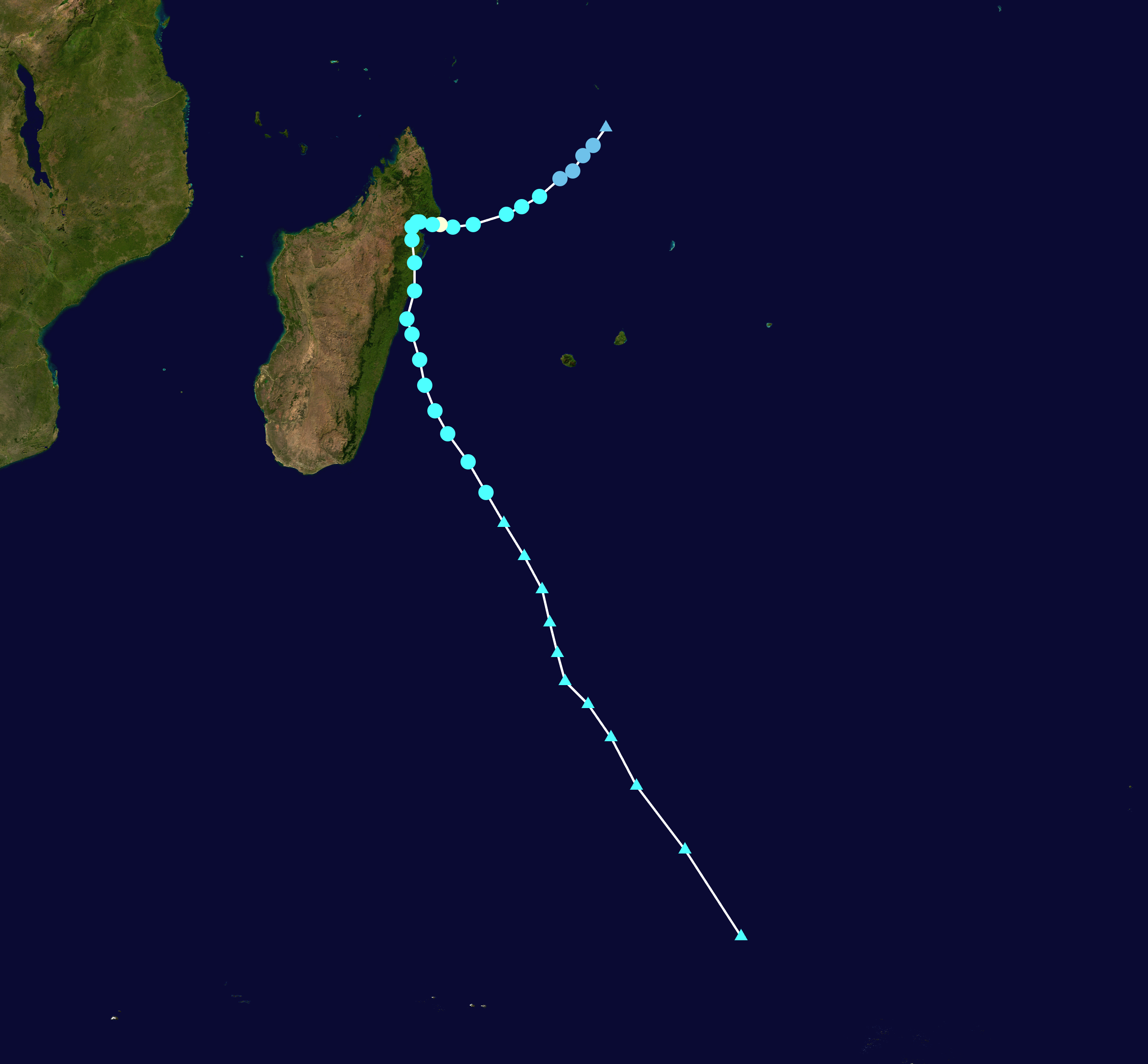
Map plotting the storm's track and intensity, according to the Saffir–Simpson scale Map key Saffir–Simpson scale Tropical depression (≤38 mph, ≤62 km/h) Tropical storm (39–73 mph, 63–118 km/h) Category 1 (74–95 mph, 119–153 km/h) Category 2 (96–110 mph, 154–177 km/h) Category 3 (111–129 mph, 178–208 km/h) Category 4 (130–156 mph, 209–251 km/h) Category 5 (≥157 mph, ≥252 km/h) Unknown Storm type Tropical cyclone Subtropical cyclone Extratropical cyclone, remnant low, tropical disturbance, or monsoon depression

On 9 March at 10:30 UTC, the Joint Typhoon Warning Center (JTWC) began monitoring an area of atmospheric convection located approximately 335 nautical miles (620 km; 385 mi) south-southwest of Diego Garcia, assessing its development potential within the next day as low. Convection was disorganized, and conditions were marginally favorable due to a beneficial upper-level environment and strong wind shear at 25–30 knots (45–55 km/h; 30–35 mph), with sea surface temperatures in the area reaching 28–29 °C (82–84 °F). Météo-France La Réunion (MFR) began monitoring the area on the next day at 12:00 UTC, assessing its risk of developing into a tropical cyclone within the next 5 days as moderate. By 11 March, MFR further upgraded the system's risk of developing into a tropical cyclone within the next 5 days to high. An advanced scatterometer pass on 12 March at 06:05 UTC showed an elongated low-level circulation, and at 18:00 UTC, the JTWC upgraded the system's development potential within the next day to medium as wind shear decreased to 15–20 knots (30–35 km/h; 15–25 mph). On 14 March at 00:00 UTC, MFR upgraded the system to a tropical disturbance, designating it as Tropical Disturbance 7. The JTWC assessed that it had developed into a tropical depression at the same time, giving it the designation 14S. Wind shear further decreased to 10–15 knots (20–30 km/h; 10–15 mph), and as the system continued to consolidate and organize, MFR upgraded 7 to a tropical depression on 14 March at 12:00 UTC, though the system's internal structure remained broad.

At 18:00 UTC, as convective activity increased, MFR upgraded 7 to a moderate tropical storm, assigning it the name Eliakim. On 15 March at 00:00 UTC, the JTWC also upgraded Eliakim to a tropical storm. At 06:00 UTC, MFR upgraded Eliakim to a severe tropical storm as its center was surrounded by strong convection, the most intense of which were located in the northwestern portion of the storm. Cloud tops slightly warmed and wrapping bands of convection tightened into the circulation over the next few hours, with favorable radial outflow negating the effects of moderate vertical wind shear. A well-defined eye appeared on microwave imagery on 16 March at approximately 02:00 UTC, though it was large and ragged. Eliakim continued over favorable environmental conditions, and at 06:00 UTC, the JTWC upgraded Eliakim to a Category 1-equivalent cyclone on the Saffir–Simpson scale, estimating maximum 1-minute sustained winds of 120 km/h (75 mph). At 07:00 UTC, Eliakim made landfall on the Masoala Peninsula. MFR assessed that Eliakim had peaked in intensity at 12:00 UTC, estimating maximum 10-minute sustained winds of 110 km/h (70 mph) and a minimum barometric pressure of 980 hPa (28.94 inHg), with the JTWC downgrading it to a tropical storm at the same time. The motion of Eliakim slowed down due to high terrain over the area and became almost stationary, with deep convective bands having weakened and collapsed as the system continued inland. Eliakim passed over the Antongil Bay before moving slightly to the north after it moved back inland. Its cloud tops experienced significant warming, though the system's internal structure remained unaffected. Convection near the system's center became relatively shallow, though conditions remained favorable despite still being inland, with low vertical wind shear and favorable outflow channels.

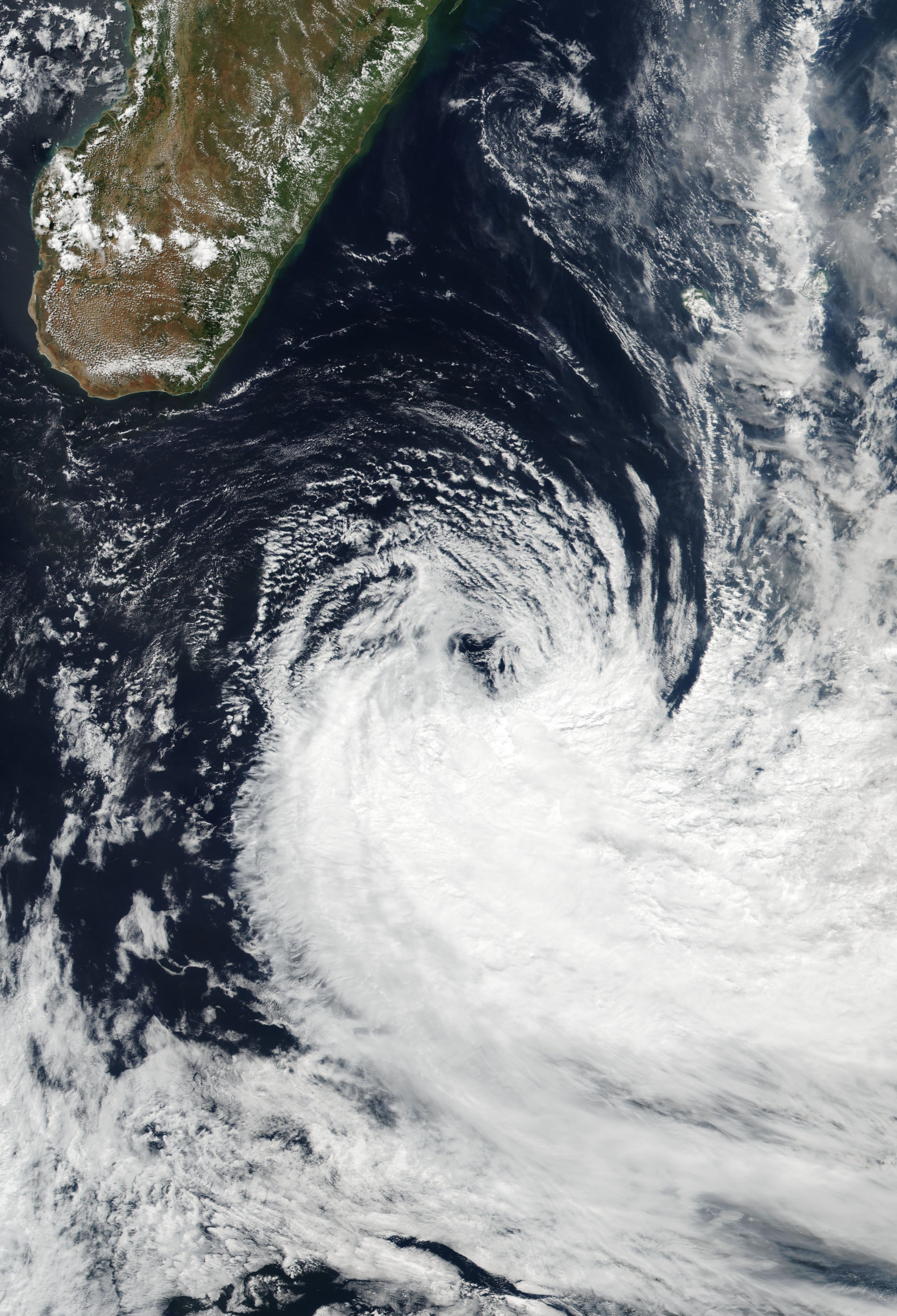
Eliakim as a post-tropical cyclone on 20 March

On 17 March at 00:00 UTC, MFR downgraded Eliakim to the equivalent of a moderate tropical storm, though it was classified as an overland depression by MFR. At 12:00 UTC, Eliakim abruptly turned to the south as convection continued to wane near the center. The storm's motion slowly sped up as land interaction severely impacted its structure, and at 21:00 UTC, Eliakim re-emerged over water, tracking into favorable conditions for further development. Sea surface temperatures in the area were at 28–29 °C (82–84 °F). The system slowly organized over the next day as its convective structure began to improve; however, its interaction with land still hindered convective intensification. Conditions gradually became unfavorable for intensification as the circulation became partially exposed, cloud tops warmed, convection moved further from the center, and wind shear increased to 25 knots (45 km/h; 30 mph). Despite this, convective activity continued, and on 19 March at 18:00 UTC, MFR upgraded Eliakim to a severe tropical storm. However, convective activity then began to decrease and move closer to the storm's center, and 6 hours later, on 20 March at 00:00 UTC, MFR downgraded Eliakim to a moderate tropical storm. Conditions continued to worsen as sea surface temperatures dropped to 25 °C (77 °F), and at 06:00 UTC, MFR assessed that Eliakim transitioned into a post-tropical depression, as advanced scatterometer data showed an elongated circulation, with rainfall also ceasing on the storm's northern side. At the same time, the JTWC assessed that Eliakim transitioned into a subtropical cyclone. On 22 March at 12:00 UTC, MFR assessed that it had transitioned into an extratropical cyclone, and 6 hours later, at 18:00 UTC, MFR stopped tracking the system.

== Preparations and impact ==
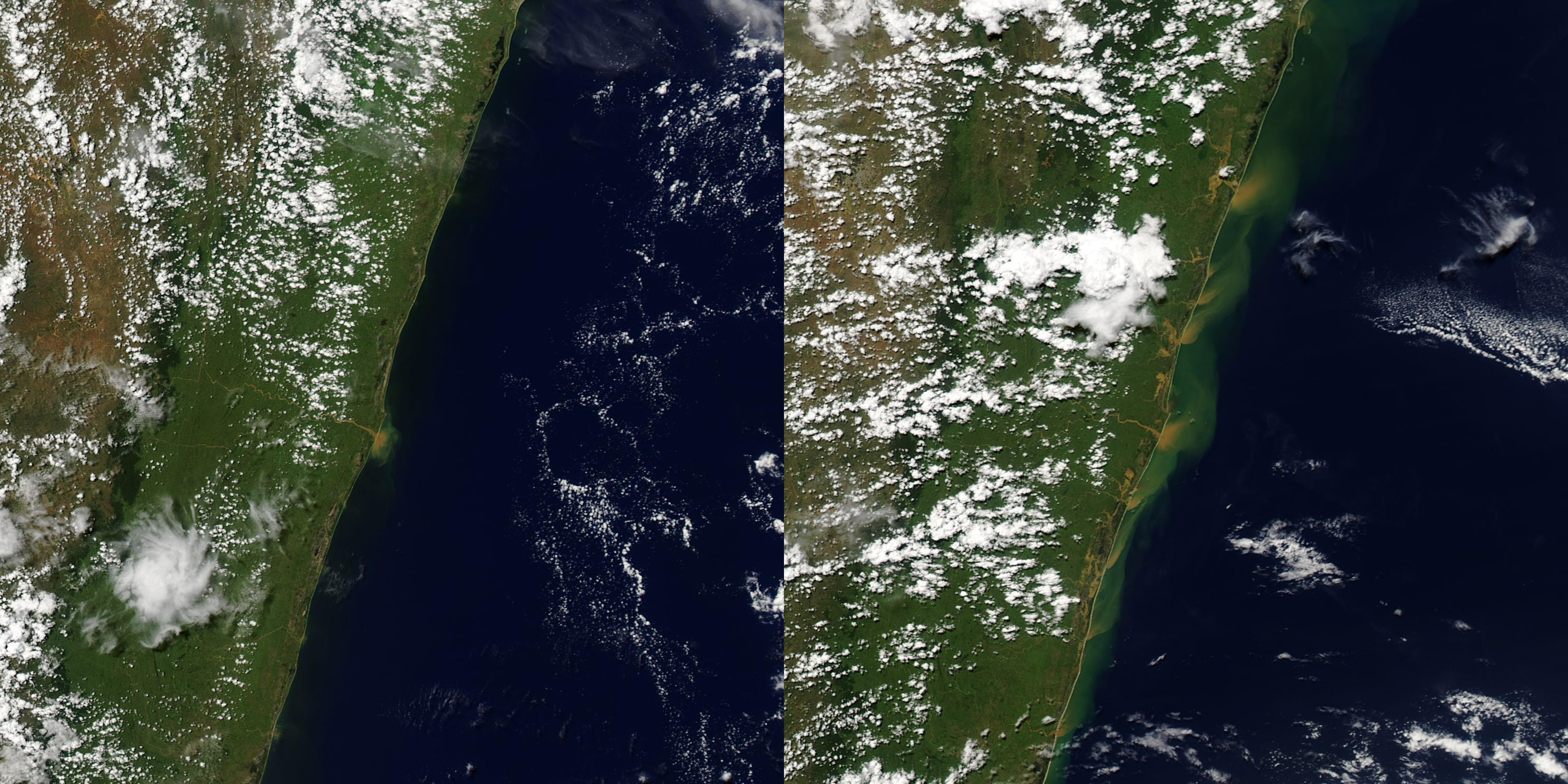
Comparison of two satellite images taken on 24 February and 19 March. The right image shows flooding and mud flowing out of rivers in the regions of Atsinanana and Vatovavy.

=== Madagascar ===
On 15 March, Météo Madagascar issued a red alert for areas in the central-eastern and northern parts of Madagascar due to heavy rains and strong winds, also issuing yellow cyclone alerts for the regions of Alaotra-Mangoro, Analanjirofo, Atsinanana, Diana, Sava, Sofia, and the district of Tsaratanana. Four teams were deployed by the Bureau National de Gestion des Risques et Catastrophes to Antalaha, Île Sainte-Marie, Maroantsetra, and Soanierana Ivongo on the same day. The Copernicus Programme's Emergency Management Service was activated on 16 March, with red cyclone alerts being issued by Météo Madagascar for the regions of Alaotra-Mangoro, Analanjirofo, Atsinanana, Sava, and the districts of Bealanana, Befandriana-Nord, and Mandritsara. Red alerts were also issued by the agency for the northern and east-central parts of Madagascar due to heavy rains and strong winds. On the same day, hundreds of people in northeast Madagascar were evacuated, with 800 people in Sambava becoming displaced. By 18 March, between 2,500 and 6,000 people were evacuated. At 13:00 UTC (16:00 EAT), a red alert was issued for the region of Vatovavy-Fitovinany due to heavy rains accompanied by occasional gale-force winds. As Eliakim moved away from the country, blue alerts were also issued for the regions of Amoron'i Mania, Analamanga, Betsiboka, Boeny, Bongolava, Diana, Haute Matsiatra, Itasy, Sava, Sofia, and Vakinankaratra. Authorities warned of landslides and floods in several regions, also advising against sea travel. On 19 March, a red alert was issued by Météo Madagascar for southeastern Madagascar due to strong winds.

The outer bands of Eliakim reached northeastern Madagascar on 15 March. Portions of the district of Ambatondrazaka were partially flooded, which prompted evacuations. Surface observations in Antalaha recorded sustained winds of 60 knots (110 km/h; 70 mph) on 16 March at 12:00 UTC. On 17 March, Air Madagascar canceled six flights due to bad weather. By 18 March, severe floods were observed in Maroantsera, with less severe floods being observed in Ambilobe and Mandritsara. At 06:00 UTC (09:00 EAT), a red alert was issued for the Matitanana River due to water levels reaching 6.3 meters (21 ft), surpassing the alert level of 5 meters (16 ft). Heavy rains in the northern areas of the country ended after 48 hours on the same day. 388 millimeters (15.3 in) of rainfall was recorded in Île Sainte-Marie, 356 millimeters (14.0 in) in Nosy Be, 319 millimeters (12.6 in) in Mananjary, and 206 millimeters (8.1 in) in Mahanoro. To aid in assessing damages, an inter-agency team flew over affected areas on 19 March and 26 March. Access to the most severely affected areas was hindered due to road damage, with flooding also isolating several villages. The immediate effects of Eliakim ceased on 20 March as it moved away from Madagascar; water levels in the Matitanana River rose further to 7 meters (23 ft). On the same day, Malagasy President Hery Rajaonarimampianina visited the district of Ambilobe to provide relief and assistance. Moderate flooding was recorded in Brickaville and Nosy Be, along with wind damage to the districts of Antalaha and Mananara Avaratra. 21 people were killed, with 19,439 people becoming displaced, 60,000 people having been affected, and hundreds of reported injuries. 15 roads were damaged, along with 27 health facilities, which disrupted the healthcare of 50,000 people. Rehabilitation works were estimated to reach 10 billion Malagasy ariary (US$3.21 million) in cost. 17,228 homes were damaged, and 43,000 people became unable to access clean water. 1,118 classrooms were damaged, which along with losses of school supplies, affected 54,000 students. Strong floods were mainly recorded in the regions of Alaotra-Mangoro, Analanjirofo, Atsinanana, Sava, and Sofia, with the main harvest season from May–June experiencing reduced productivity due to flooding. Using satellite data, a study estimated that 26 percent of rice fields along with 67 percent of farms with other crops were flooded; clove crops were also damaged in Analanjirofo. Communications were disrupted in some parts of northeastern and eastern Madagascar. Landslides were generated by rainfall on saturated soil, with at least six landslides being reported on the Route nationale 2, five more having occurred between Ranomafana and Marolambo, and several more on the Route nationale 5, the Route nationale 31, and the Route nationale 32.

=== Elsewhere ===
On 17 March, 430 firefighters were mobilized in Réunion to aid with rescues. An orange alert was issued by MFR for the southwestern portion of Réunion due to strong winds on 19 March. Waves reaching 5–6 meters (16–20 ft) affected the island, impacting coastal roads and forcing the closure of lanes close to shore. Several areas recorded gusts above 100 kilometers per hour (62 mph), with Maïdo recording 151 kilometers per hour (94 mph) and Colimaçons recording 110 kilometers per hour (68 mph). Takamaka recorded rainfall of 756 millimeters (29.8 in) accumulated over 6 days, with Grand Îlet recording 350 millimeters (14 in) of rainfall within a day and Hauts de Ste-Rose recording 228.8 millimeters (9.01 in) of rainfall within 3 hours.

Within 6 hours in Mayotte, 67.2 millimeters (2.65 in) of rainfall was recorded in Mzouazia, 37.2 millimeters (1.46 in) in Pamandzi, 23 millimeters (0.91 in) in Dembeni, and 21.5 millimeters (0.85 in) in Coconi. Eliakim caused landslides on 18 March; it affected voters during an ongoing election.

Enhanced rainfall over Kenya associated with Eliakim caused flooding in vulnerable areas.

Tromelin Island recorded 10-minute sustained winds of 45 knots (85 km/h; 50 mph) on 15 March.

Cloud bands under the influence of Eliakim brought cloudy skies to Mauritius.

== See also ==
- Weather of 2017 and 2018
- Tropical cyclones in 2017 and 2018
- Cyclone Ava
- Cyclone Dumazile
- Cyclone Enawo
