= Special Mobile Force =

Paramilitary force of Mauritius

- Active: 1960
- Country: Mauritius
- Agency: Mauritius Police Force
- Role: National security, disaster relief
- Headquarters: Vacoas
- Abbreviation: SMF

The Special Mobile Force (French: Force Mobile Spéciale) is a paramilitary unit of Mauritius that ensures the country's internal and external security. As Mauritius has no dedicated military, the SMF forms part of the Mauritius Police Force, with its personnel on long-term rotation from the police force.

== History ==
The SMF was formed following the withdrawal of the British garrison on Mauritius, mainly detachments of the King's African Rifles, in 1960. The primary task of the SMF when it was formed was to ensure the internal and external security of the country. As formed, the SMF's initial makeup was made up of members of the local police force and Mauritian veterans of World War II.

British military officers led the unit, but it was not until 1978 when Colonel D. Bhima BEM MPM was appointed as the first SMF commanding officer of Mauritian origin.

In 2013, it was reported to have a manpower of 1,400 officers.

== Organisation ==
The SMF is formed as a battlegroup consisting of approximately 1,500 men led by a Commanding Officer. The majority of these men form six motorised infantry companies. In addition, there are two squadrons equipped with armoured vehicles and an engineering squadron. Although the SMF is not a military unit, it is organised along military lines, with training based on basic military doctrine.

The SMF commands the Groupe Intervention de la Police Mauricien (GIPM) (English: Mauritian Police Intervention Group), the SMF's special forces unit.

Although the primary role of the SMF is the internal and external security of Mauritius, it is also used in several other roles such as ceremonial guards of honour, search and rescue operations, bomb disposal, debris clearance and opening of roads after cyclones and other emergencies.

== Badge and motto ==
The badge of the SMF is made up of a wreath of oak leaves surmounted by the national coat of arms. Within the wreath are the letters S and F, with a lightning flash between them, to symbolise the letters "SMF". Beneath the wreath is a scroll with the name "Special Mobile Force Mauritius".

The first motto of the SMF was The Difficult We Do Immediately. The Impossible Takes A Little Longer. This was then changed to the current motto We'll Do It. What Is It.

== Alliances ==
- United Kingdom – The Rifles
