= Cyclone Ava =

South-West Indian Ocean cyclone in 2017

Tropical Cyclone Ava
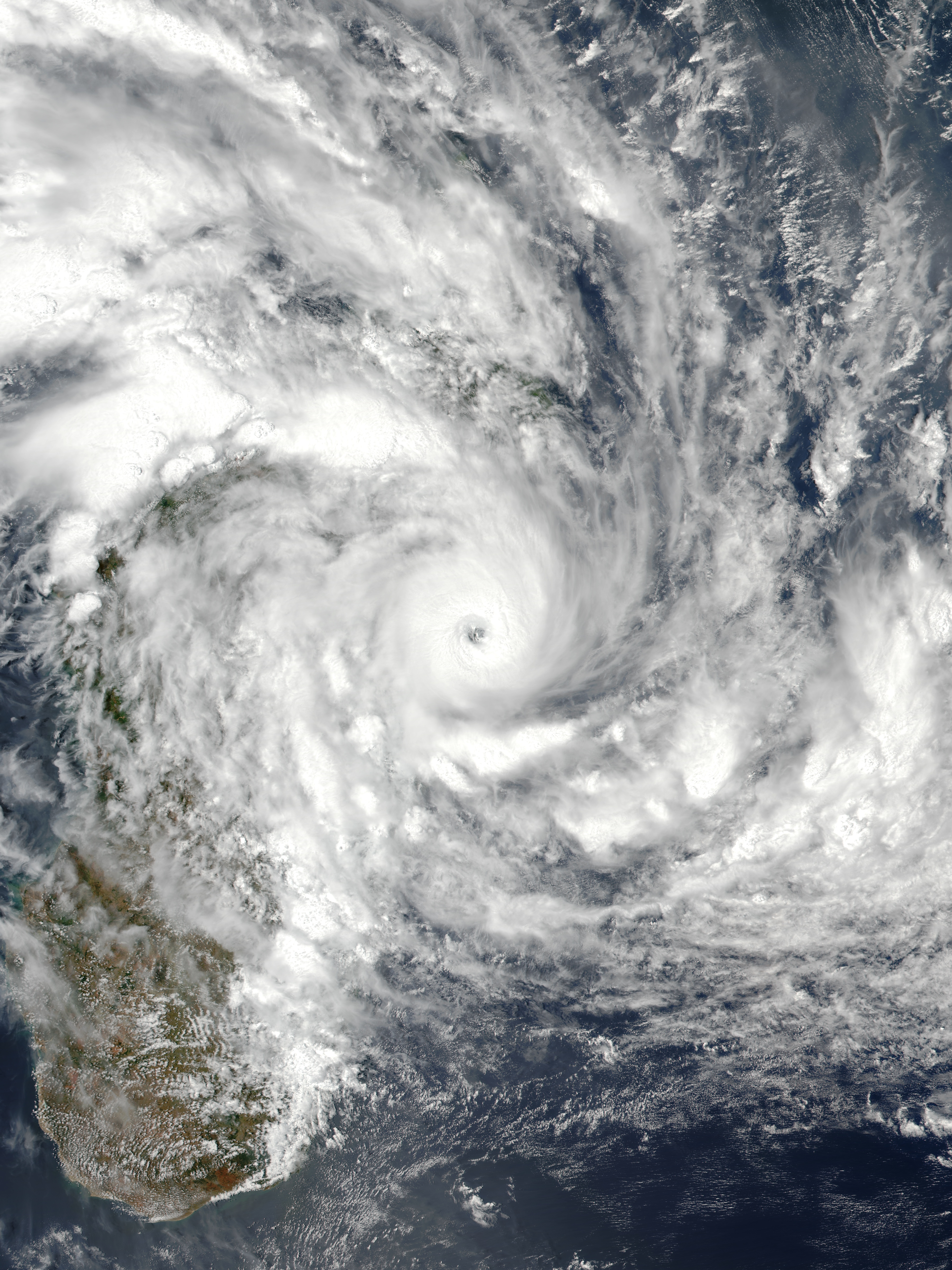
- Ava near peak intensity making landfall in eastern Madagascar on January 5

Meteorological history
- Formed: January 1, 2018
- Post-tropical: January 8, 2018
- Dissipated: January 9, 2018

Tropical cyclone
- 10-minute sustained (MF)
- Highest winds: 150 km/h (90 mph)
- Highest gusts: 215 km/h (130 mph)
- Lowest pressure: 965 hPa (mbar); 28.50 inHg

Category 2-equivalent tropical cyclone
- 1-minute sustained (SSHWS/JTWC)
- Highest winds: 175 km/h (110 mph)
- Lowest pressure: 958 hPa (mbar); 28.29 inHg

Overall effects
- Fatalities: 51
- Missing: 22
- Damage: $195 million (2018 USD)
- Areas affected: St. Brandon, Tromelin Island, Madagascar
- IBTrACS /
- Part of the 2017–18 South-West Indian Ocean cyclone season

Tropical Cyclone Ava was a strong tropical cyclone that brought devastating impacts to parts of eastern Madagascar in January 2018. The first tropical depression, first named storm, and first tropical cyclone of the 2017–18 South-West Indian Ocean cyclone season, Ava formed as a weak area of disturbed weather well northeast of St. Brandon on December 30. Monitored by Météo-France La Réunion (MFR), the disturbance drifted southwest, before intensifying to a moderate tropical storm on January 2. Ava drifted south afterwards with little change in strength; then among favorable conditions near the coast of Madagascar Ava rapidly intensified to tropical cyclone intensity by early on January 5 shortly before making landfall in eastern Madagascar. After landfall, Ava pummeled the region with rainfall and flooding as it weakens into a moderate tropical storm. Ava exited the landmass on January 7 and became post-tropical southeast of southern Madagascar on January 8, slowly drifting southwards as a vigorous low before dissipating a day later.

Ava's catastrophic impact caused at least 51 confirmed deaths in the country, while 22 others were suspected dead. Ava caused at least $195 million (2018 USD) or 744 billion ariary of damage, which was also driven by impacts of the seasonal monsoon which already brought periods of heavy rain and flash flooding in portions of the country. The cyclone significantly impacted the capital of Madagascar, Antananarivo, and destroyed a large portion of the city's infrastructure.

== Meteorological history ==
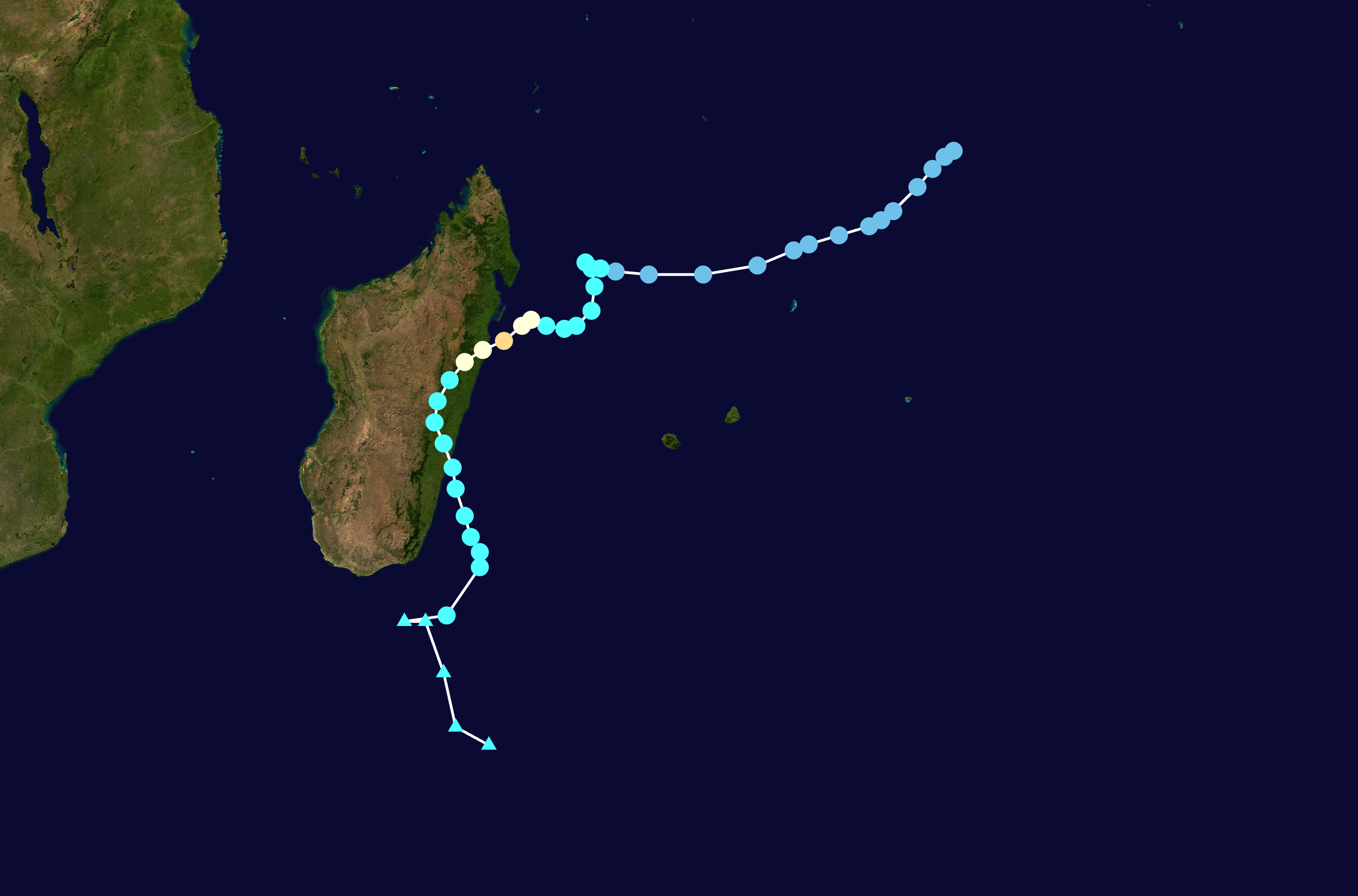
Map plotting the storm's track and intensity, according to the Saffir–Simpson scale Map key Saffir–Simpson scale Tropical depression (≤38 mph, ≤62 km/h) Tropical storm (39–73 mph, 63–118 km/h) Category 1 (74–95 mph, 119–153 km/h) Category 2 (96–110 mph, 154–177 km/h) Category 3 (111–129 mph, 178–208 km/h) Category 4 (130–156 mph, 209–251 km/h) Category 5 (≥157 mph, ≥252 km/h) Unknown Storm type Tropical cyclone Subtropical cyclone Extratropical cyclone, remnant low, tropical disturbance, or monsoon depression

On December 21, MFR first began noting the potential of cyclonic activity over the basin due to an emerging increase of thunderstorm activity near three weak circulation centers located within the basin, however conditions were considered only marginally favorable due to dry air and an approaching upper-level trough to the east. By December 25, an ill-defined clockwise circulation with minimal convective activity developed south of Diego Garcia. Conditions were expected to steadily become more favorable for some degree of tropical cyclogenesis as an active Madden–Julian oscillation (MJO) pattern settled over the basin and low level convergence increased on the system's northern side. Thunderstorm activity increased around the system by December 26, although erratically as a result of the diurnal cycle, and the center became gradually more defined. Amid only slightly conducive conditions, however, the center remained somewhat elongated for the next few days. A closed low formed on January 1, and MFR classified the system as a tropical disturbance at 12:00 UTC that day. Deep convection began to persist near the circulation, and ground observations from Tromelin Island on January 2 indicated the system's low-level center was becoming more well defined. Further observations from scatterometer data suggested the system's center was no longer elongated, and the system was upgraded to a tropical depression at 12:00 UTC. Conditions were considered relatively favorable for rapid intensification due to insignificant wind shear and strong poleward and equatorward low-level convergence. At the time, the disturbance was being steered slowly southwest towards the Malagasy coastline by a subtropical ridge situated over the central part of the basin.

A scatterometer pass at the beginning of January 3 revealed a large swath of 65 km/h (40 mph) winds in the northern side of the depression's circulation, warranting an upgrade from MFR to Moderate Tropical Storm Ava at around 06:00 UTC that day, about 300 km (190 mi) east of Antalaha; post-season analysis showed the system had already reached this intensity at 18:00 UTC the day before. The Joint Typhoon Warning Center (JTWC) also began to initiate advisories on the tropical storm around this time. The storm's movement began to slow down by this point as a low-pressure area south of Madagascar weakened the steering flow from the ridge steering Ava. Now moving in a more southerly direction, Ava changed little in intensity throughout the day with its exposed circulation but wind shear was soon expected to relax. By the next day, the re-strengthening ridge began to push Ava west-southwest into a more favorable environment and thus Ava subsequently began to intensify as a burst of deep convection occurred near the center. The storm quickly intensified from a moderate tropical storm to a severe tropical storm, while the JTWC upgraded the system to the equivalent of a low-end Category 1 hurricane as a central dense overcast bloomed. Continuing to rapidly intensify into January 5, Ava unexpectedly intensified further to a tropical cyclone, while the JTWC upgraded Ava to the equivalent of a high-end Category 2 hurricane with winds of 175 km/h (110 mph) as a well defined eye emerged surrounded by a ring of intense thunderstorms. Ava reached its peak intensity at 12:00 UTC just off the coast of Madagascar, possessing 10-minute sustained winds of 150 km/h (90 mph), gusts to 215 km/h (130 mph), and a minimum pressure of 965 hPa (28.50 inHg).

Ava made landfall on Toamasina around 16:00 UTC on that same day at peak intensity, before quickly weakening back down to the equivalent of a tropical storm as the eye and eyewall collapsed. Ava slowly meandered south through eastern Madagascar as a weak tropical storm throughout January 6. Under the influence of another upper-level trough, Ava moved to the east while it moved back over sea and exited the Malagasy landmass by early on January 7. Ava began a brief period of re-intensification as it drifted south-southeast away from Madagascar while conditions remained slightly favorable, with the central pressure falling back down to 987 hPa (29.15 inHg). A day after, increasing southwesterly shear began to weaken the storm again and displace the thunderstorm activity well away from the center, while ocean heat content became insufficient. MFR declared Ava had become a post-tropical depression by 18:00 UTC on January 8, and the JTWC issued their final advisory on Ava 12 hours later. The remnants of Ava continued heading southeast and dissipated entirely late on January 9.

== Impact ==
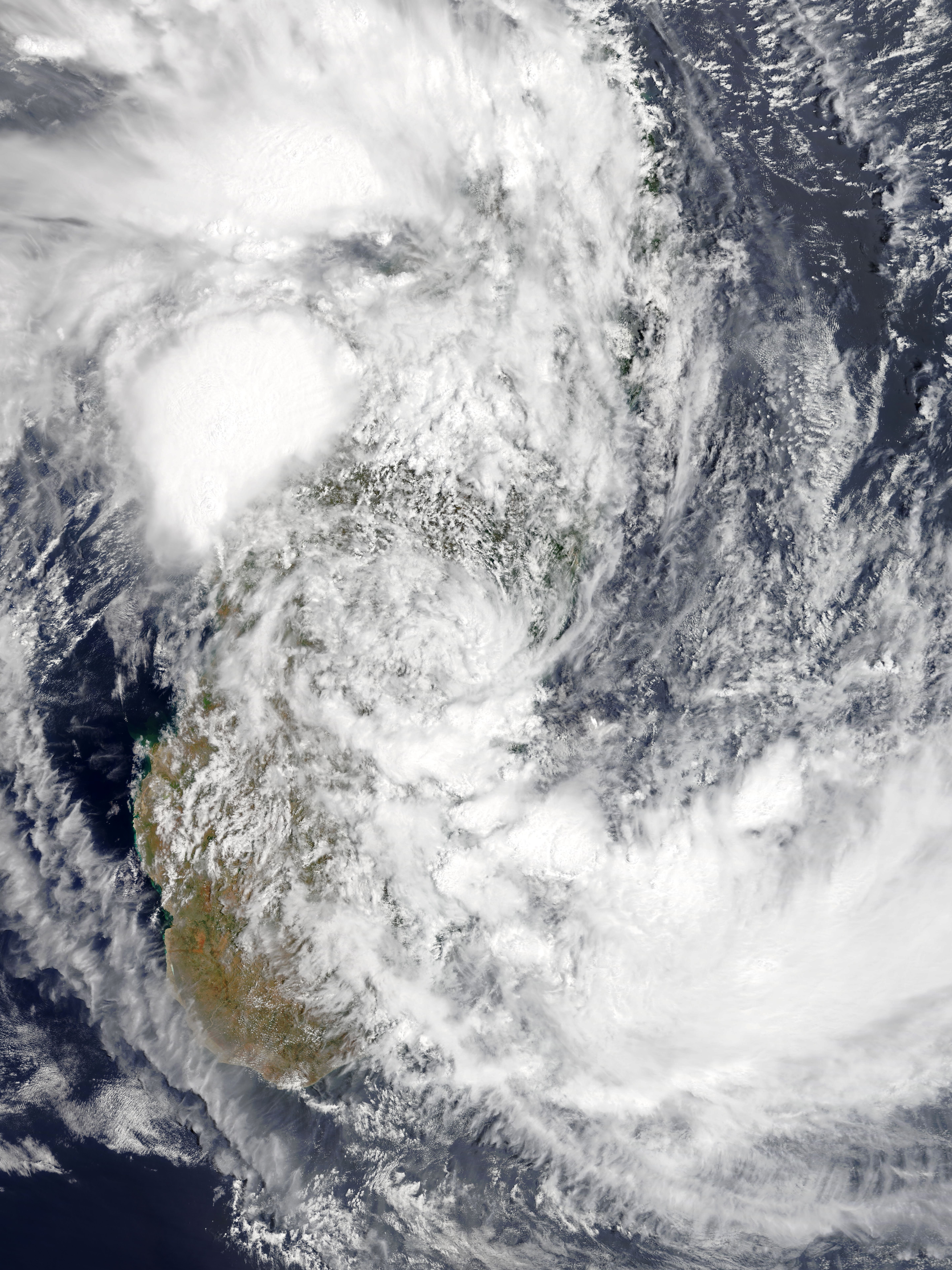
Ava inland over Madagascar on January 6

The system's precursor low passed over the uninhabited Tromelin Island, though no wind gusts were recorded in the island. In Saint-Denis, Réunion, Ava caused 50 mm (2.0 in) of rain. Meanwhile, in Mauritius, 200 mm (7.87) inches of rain were received in some regions and these rains caused floods that was damaging to the local agriculture.

As Ava moved towards Madagascar, Meteo Madagascar issued a red alert to the eastern central shores of the country, advising people to be vigilant and compliant to the local authorities. Shortly before making landfall on Madagascar, a station in Toamasina recorded sustained winds of 120 km/h (75 mph) with a pressure of 966.5 hPa (28.54 inHg) before being obstructed, agreeing with the intensity consensus. The passage of Ava left 51 dead and 22 missing in the country. Impacts driven by Ava bundled with the seasonal monsoon were estimated to have caused at least US$195 million in total losses. This was measured to have impacted at least 2.9% of the country's total GDP measured from 2017. Around 51,000 residents in the country were left homeless following the storm's exit. 19 health facilities were destroyed by the storm, while 141 schools were affected, including 77 classrooms of these schools that turned into shelters for displaced people. 24,873 people were displaced by the storm and drove 34,641 students out of school. Among the worst hit areas in the country was the capital Antananarivo where many landslides and floods caused hundreds of people to evacuate. The city of Toamasina was heavily impacted as well and over 90% of infrastructure in the port city was destroyed. Towns that had been already impacted by Cyclone Enawo 10 months earlier were impacted by Ava. The Ambatovy mine, one of the world's largest sources of nickel and located in a rainforest around 200 km (120 mi) away from the city was shut down from operation because of considerable damages to facilities and equipment. A dam in Soavina, Betafo was broken and floods destroyed around 30% of all crops in the Vakinankaratra Region. Unusually, a new species of Rhombophryne frog known as Rhombophryne ellae was discovered during the cyclone– presumably as it was forced from its natural habitat.

Eventually, Severe Tropical Storm Eliakim impacted the same areas in March yet again. Response to Ava began in March at the same time after Eliakim impacted the country because of the lingering effects from Enawo impact, and thus response teams were responding to both tropical cyclones. Headed by United Nations Children's Fund, donors from across the country raised about nearly $1 million (2018 USD) to fund the relief efforts to meet the needs for children and their families that was affected by both tropical cyclones. United Nations Children's Fund also provided medical supplies, educational kits, nutritional goods, hygiene products and disinfection of wells for people in these impacted regions.

== See also ==
- Weather of 2017 and 2018
- Tropical cyclones in 2017 and 2018
- Cyclone Giovanna – made landfall in the Atsinanana Region of Madagascar six years earlier.
- Cyclone Francisco – a weak tropical cyclone that affected similar areas two years later.
