= Hurricane Lorenzo (2019) =

Category 5 Atlantic hurricane

- Hurricane Lorenzo near peak intensity on 29 September

Meteorological history
- Formed: 23 September 2019
- Extratropical: 2 October 2019
- Dissipated: 7 October 2019

Category 5 major hurricane
- 1-minute sustained (SSHWS/NWS)
- Highest winds: 160 mph (260 km/h)
- Lowest pressure: 925 mbar (hPa); 27.32 inHg

Overall effects
- Fatalities: 20 (19 direct, 1 indirect)
- Damage: $367 million (2019 USD)
- Areas affected: West Africa, Cape Verde, Lesser Antilles, Eastern United States, Ireland, Azores, United Kingdom, France, Germany, Eastern Europe
- IBTrACS
- Part of the 2019 Atlantic hurricane season

Hurricane Lorenzo, also known as Storm Lorenzo in Ireland and the United Kingdom while extratropical, was the easternmost Category 5 Atlantic hurricane on record. Lorenzo was the twelfth named storm, fifth hurricane, third major hurricane and second Category 5 hurricane of the 2019 Atlantic hurricane season. The storm formed from a tropical wave that moved off the west coast of Africa on 22 September, growing larger in size over the course of its development. It strengthened into a hurricane on 25 September, and rapidly intensified into a Category 4 hurricane the following day before weakening due to an eyewall replacement cycle. After completing the cycle, Lorenzo rapidly restrengthened, peaking at Category 5 intensity on 29 September with 1-minute sustained winds of 160 mph. Steady weakening followed as the storm moved through unfavorable atmospheric conditions. Accelerating northeastward, Lorenzo skirted the western Azores on 2 October, and transitioned into an extratropical cyclone. The extratropical cyclone moved quickly towards Ireland and the United Kingdom and became the first named storm of the 2019–20 European windstorm season, before eventually dissipating on 7 October.

Through late September and early October, large swells were generated by the hurricane's massive wind field, impacting much of the Atlantic basin. The French ship Bourbon Rhode capsized amid the violent seas on 27 September; among its 14 crew members, three were rescued, four drowned, and the remaining seven are presumed dead. Four people drowned in rip currents along the coast of North Carolina, and two people were found dead after being swept away by large waves along the coast of New York. Dangerous sea conditions also spread to Bermuda and as far south as the Caribbean coasts of South America. On 2 October, Lorenzo passed near the western Azores, briefly bringing strong winds to much of the archipelago. Flores and Corvo endured the worst of these winds, with a maximum gust of 163 km/h (101 mph) recorded on the latter island. The extratropical remnants of Lorenzo then affected Ireland and the United Kingdom on 3 and 4 October, bringing gusty winds and heavy rains. Total damage from the storm was estimated at US$367 million, and 20 fatalities resulted from it.

== Meteorological history ==
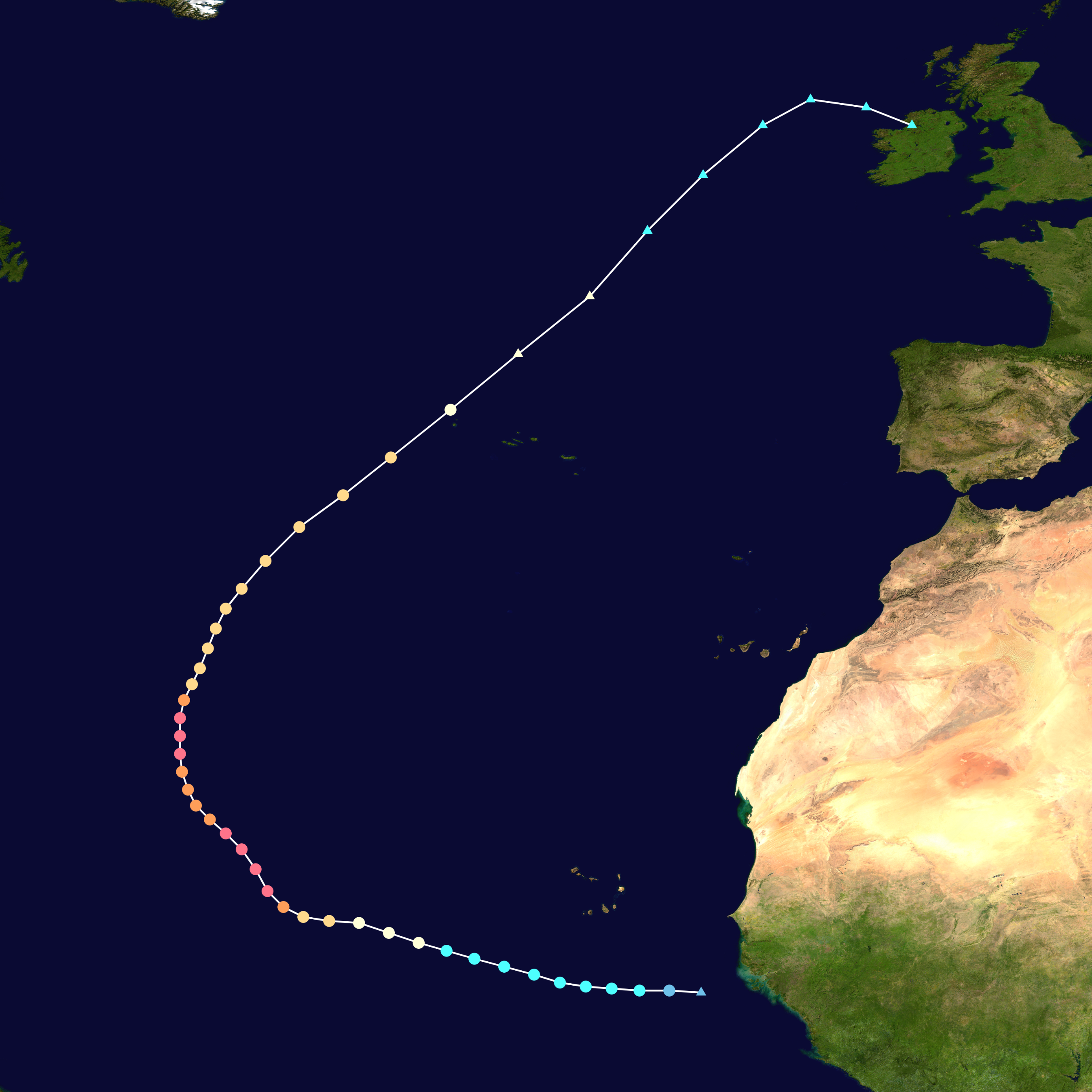
Map plotting the storm's track and intensity, according to the Saffir–Simpson scale (Note: The position of Lorenzo's Category 5 peak is not depicted in this graphic as it is an asynoptic point (i.e. not at the 6-hour intervals of all other points) occurring at 03:00 UTC 29 September.) Map key Saffir–Simpson scale Tropical depression (≤38 mph, ≤62 km/h) Tropical storm (39–73 mph, 63–118 km/h) Category 1 (74–95 mph, 119–153 km/h) Category 2 (96–110 mph, 154–177 km/h) Category 3 (111–129 mph, 178–208 km/h) Category 4 (130–156 mph, 209–251 km/h) Category 5 (≥157 mph, ≥252 km/h) Unknown Storm type Tropical cyclone Subtropical cyclone Extratropical cyclone, remnant low, tropical disturbance, or monsoon depression

On 19 September, the National Hurricane Center (NHC) began to monitor a tropical wave that was forecast to emerge from the west coast of Africa; the tropical wave emerged into the Atlantic Ocean on 22 September. Due to favorable conditions, the system quickly organized, and at 00:00 UTC on the next day, the wave organized into Tropical Depression Thirteen. Six hours later, the system strengthened into a tropical storm and received the name Lorenzo, while south of Cape Verde. Lorenzo further intensified into a Category 1 hurricane early on 25 September and became a Category 2 hurricane the following day. Over the ensuing 48 hours, the storm underwent rapid intensification, reaching its initial peak intensity as a Category 4 hurricane with winds of 145 miles per hour (230 km/h) and a central pressure of 937 mbar (hPa; 27.67 inHg) at 00:00 UTC on 27 September.

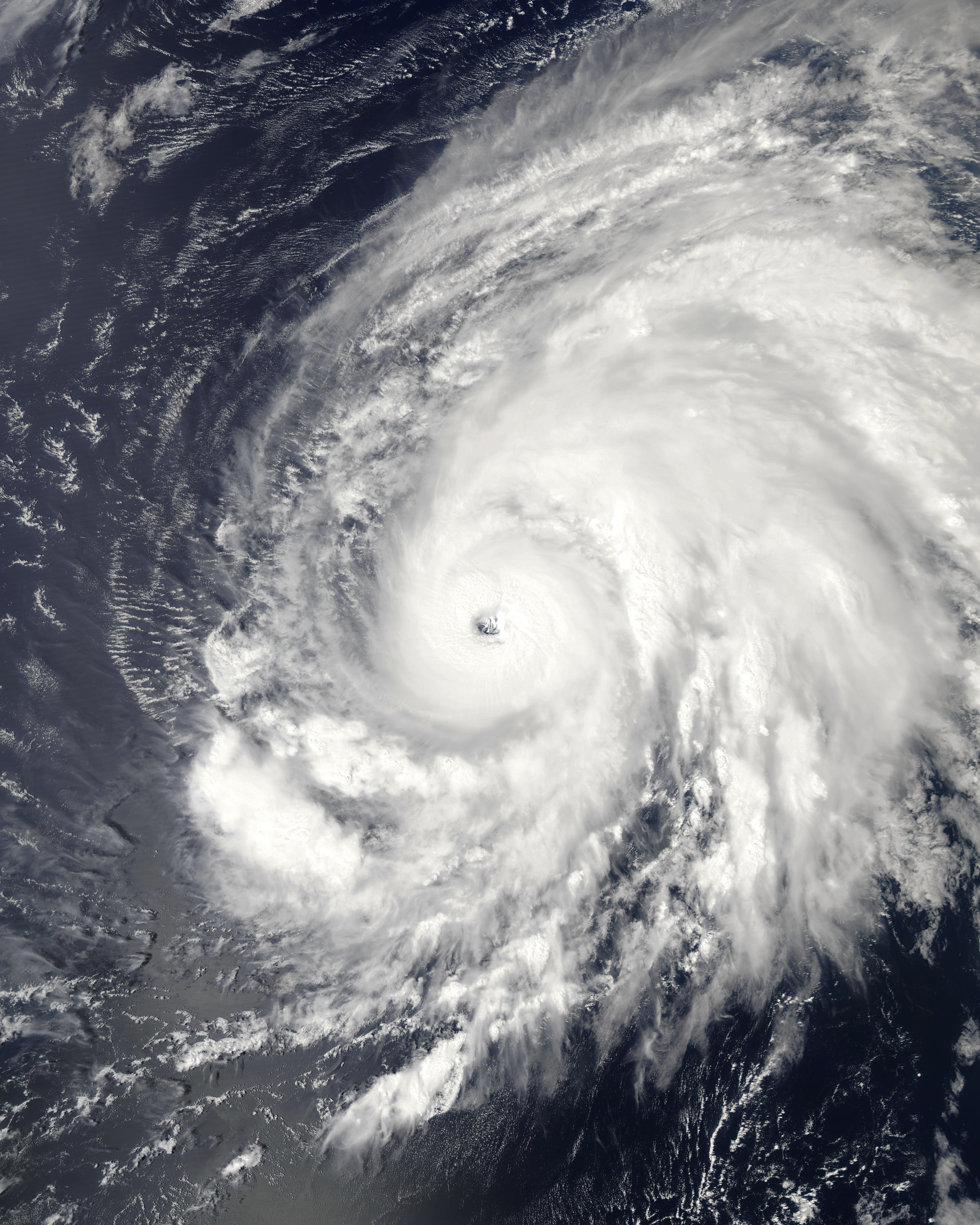
Hurricane Lorenzo near its initial peak intensity on 26 September.

As Lorenzo began to turn slowly northward, the hurricane weakened with the onset of an eyewall replacement cycle and intrusions of dry air. The hurricane bottomed out as a low-end Category 3 hurricane on 28 September. Although restrengthening was not forecast due to moderate wind shear and low ocean heat content, Lorenzo defied expectations and rapidly reintensified into a Category 4 hurricane upon completing its eyewall replacement. Continuing to intensify, Lorenzo reached Category 5 strength at 03:00 UTC on 29 September, becoming the easternmost hurricane of such intensity recorded in the Atlantic basin, surpassing Hugo in 1989.

Lorenzo's peak was short-lived because of increasing wind shear, cooler waters, and an intrusion of dry air; the hurricane lost its Category 5 status 3 hours after peak intensity, and weakened faster than it had strengthened. By 18:00 UTC, only 15 hours after peak intensity, it had weakened below major hurricane strength. The hurricane's large size caused it to upwell cool water. Early on 2 October, Lorenzo began extratropical transition, passing west of Flores Island. By this time, it had weakened to a Category 1 hurricane, but still brought hurricane-force winds to the islands. Lorenzo became fully extratropical by 12:00 UTC on 2 October. The extratropical cyclone continued moving quickly northeastward, maintaining an expansive wind field, which resulted in an extended period of gale-force winds for Ireland. On 4 October, Lorenzo's remnant made landfall on Ireland, and the low-level circulation center of the cyclone became ill-defined shortly thereafter. However, Lorenzo's extratropical remnant persisted for another few days, with the storm moving southeastward, moving over Germany on 5 October. Afterward, Lorenzo's remnant continued its southeastward motion while gradually weakening, before dissipating over Romania on 7 October.

=== Records ===
In addition to being the easternmost Category 5 Atlantic hurricane on record, beating out 1989's Hurricane Hugo, Lorenzo featured the highest accumulated cyclone energy (ACE) index of any Atlantic tropical cyclone on record to the east of 45th meridian west. Additionally, Lorenzo spent more days as a major hurricane east of 45th meridian west than any previous cyclone on record, surpassing Carrie of 1957.

== Preparations and impact ==
IR Animation of Hurricane Lorenzo reaching peak intensity, 29 September – SSEC/CIMSS, University of Wisconsin–Madison.

=== Bourbon Rhode ===
On 26 September, the Luxembourg-flagged anchor handling tugboat Bourbon Rhode, with 14 crew members on board, issued a distress signal at 08:20 UTC about 70 mi (110 km) from the eye of Lorenzo—approximately 1,110 mi (1,790 km) west of Cape Verde. At the time, the hurricane was rapidly intensifying from Category 2 to Category 4 strength. The ship continued to receive signals until 12:20 UTC, by which time it presumably sank. The bulk carrier SSI Excellent arrived the following day as search and rescue operations began; a NOAA Hurricane Hunter aircraft was diverted from a research mission to assist in the search. Additional commercial vessels and French aircraft arrived over the following days. Three crew members were spotted on a life raft by a French aircraft and rescued on 28 September. By 2 October, four bodies were recovered while the remaining seven crew members were still missing. With no additional signs of the crew, French authorities suspended rescue operations on 5 October. The three survivors were transferred to Martinique on 6 October, while the bodies of the four other crewmen were repatriated to their families. On 7 October the tugboat ALP Striker reported distress flares. Search and rescue resumed on 9 October, albeit at a much smaller scale, after calls to French authorities by the Croatian and Ukrainian governments. Relatives of those on the ship established a fund to pay for private jets to continue aerial surveillance. However, in its final report on the storm, the NHC concluded that the missing crew members perished, leaving three survivors of the 14 crew members.

On 4 October, relatives of crew members and people who worked on the vessel indicated that repairs on the ship were incomplete and it was not ready for a trans-Atlantic voyage. In particular, the propulsion and steering systems were not of sufficient quality.

=== Americas ===
Despite being over 2,000 mi (3,200 km) away from the storm, United States National Weather Service (NWS) offices in Florida and North Carolina warned that the swells from Lorenzo could cause rip currents and beach erosion. People in coastal areas were advised to avoid being by the beaches. However, four people drowned after being caught in rip currents in North Carolina. In New York City, three people were swept away by strong waves. One of them was rescued, but the other two were found dead. In Rhode Island, one fisherman drowned after falling into rough surf, and in Florida, a man drowned while swimming in rough conditions caused by the hurricane.

In Bermuda, Horseshoe Bay was closed to swimmers because of the dangerous swells. The storm's influence on sea conditions was felt as far south as the coasts of the Caribbean and South America.

=== Azores ===
Early on 30 September, the Instituto Português do Mar e da Atmosfera (IPMA) issued hurricane and tropical storm watches for the Azores, which were upgraded to warnings later that day. Schools and government offices were closed on 2 October and people were told to remain indoors. Azores Airlines cancelled all flights to the islands. Lorenzo was regarded as the strongest storm to hit the islands in 20 years. Wind gusts of 163 km/h (101 mph) were recorded at Corvo Island, while gusts at Faial Island and Flores Island reached 145 and 142 km/h (90 and 88 mph) respectively. Wave heights reached 15 m (49 ft) in the islands. A total of 53 people were left homeless and had to be relocated. The most serious damage occurred at the Port of Lajes das Flores, the only commercial port on Flores Island. The port building and some cargo containers were swept away, while the dock itself was partially damaged. On 3 October, the government of the Azores declared an "energy crisis situation" in Flores and Corvo due to difficulties in supplying fuel to the two islands. Limits were placed on the sale of petrol at petrol stations on the two islands for the rest of October. Total damage across the island chain were around €330 million (US$367 million), making it one of the costliest cyclones to impact the Azores in recent times.

=== Ireland ===
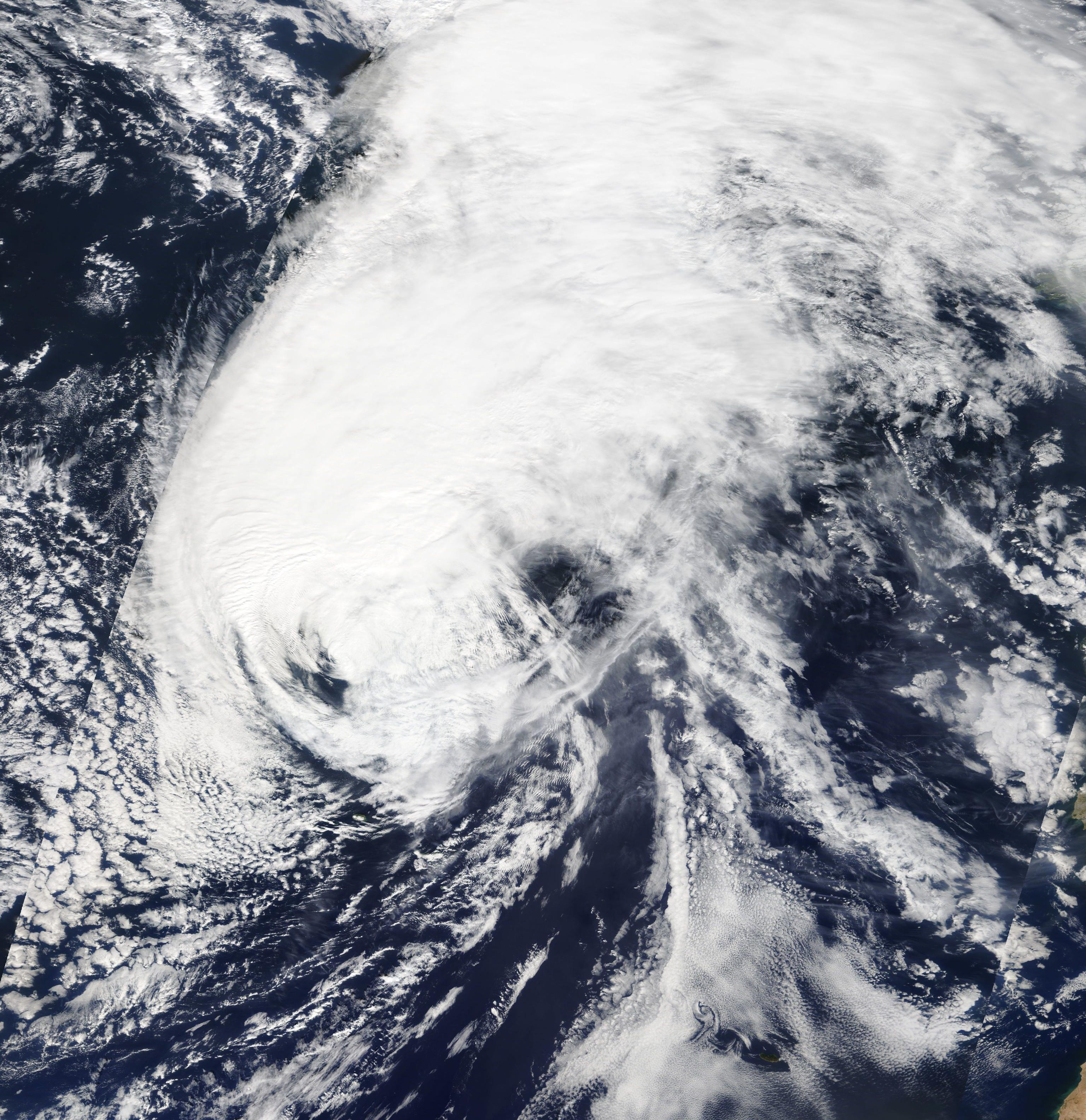
Lorenzo approaching the British Isles on 2 October, shortly after extratropical transition

On 2 October, Met Éireann issued an orange wind warning for six counties on the western coast. Met Éireann also noted the potential for coastal flooding and damage due to large storm surges. On the next day, Met Éireann issued a yellow wind warning for the entire country, and issued yellow rainfall warnings for Connacht, Leinster, Cavan, Monaghan and Donegal. Several flights at Dublin Airport were cancelled.

On 3 October, the extratropical remnants of Lorenzo passed over an M6 Buoy, which is located about 400 km (250 mi) west of Mace Head in Galway, recorded a pressure of 969 hPa (28.6 inHg). The buoy also noted waves of 12.5 m (41 ft) near the center of Lorenzo. A peak gust of 107 km/h (66 mph) was observed at Mace Head. Thousands of homes and businesses lost power, with the Electricity Supply Board restoring 12,000 outages during the night of 3–4 October; another 7,500 homes remained without power in the morning. By Friday, 4 October, all power had been restored. Donegal town was partially flooded after 50 mm (2.0 in) of rain fell as the River Eske approached high tide. Floodwaters reached 8 in (20 cm) deep in houses next to the river, while several roads were blocked. The nearby towns of Bundoran, Frosses, and Laghey also suffered significant flooding. Damage in the country was generally minimal, with no injuries or major incidents reported.

=== United Kingdom ===
On 2 October, the Met Office issued a yellow wind warning for parts of Northern Ireland, as well as Cornwall, Devon and parts of Wales. One person was killed in Stafford after being struck by a falling tree. In general, however, disruption from Storm Lorenzo was minimal, with the weather warnings lifted by 4 October.

== See also ==
- Timeline of the 2019 Atlantic hurricane season
- Tropical cyclones in 2019
- Other storms of the same name
- List of Category 5 Atlantic hurricanes
- List of Azores hurricanes
- Hurricane Hugo (1989) – the easternmost Category 5 Atlantic hurricane prior to Lorenzo
- Hurricane Isaac (2000) – took a similar track at a similar time of year
- Hurricane Karl (2004) – took a similar track in the open Atlantic
- Hurricane Julia (2010) – the easternmost Category 4 Atlantic hurricane
- Hurricane Ophelia (2017) – Category 3 hurricane that likewise affected the Azores and the British Isles
- Hurricane Kirk (2024) – took a similar track
