= Timeline of the 2019 Pacific hurricane season =

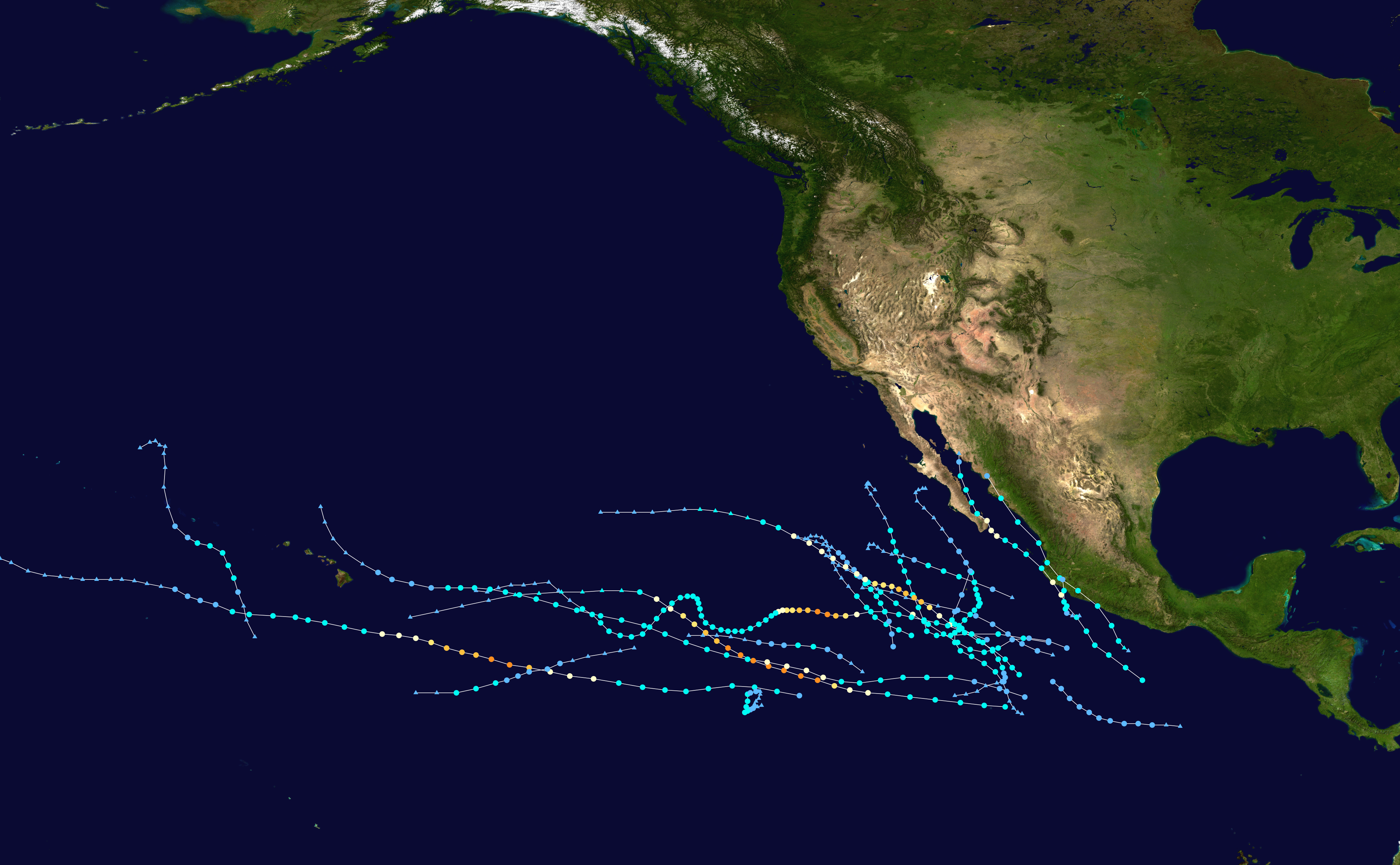
- Season summary map

Season boundaries
- First system formed: June 25, 2019
- Last system dissipated: November 18, 2019

Strongest system
- Name: Barbara
- Maximum winds: 155 mph (250 km/h) (1-minute sustained)
- Lowest pressure: 930 mbar (hPa; 27.46 inHg)

Longest lasting system
- Name: Kiko
- Duration: 12 days
Storm articles
- Tropical Storm Ivo (2019)
- Hurricane Lorena (2019)
- Tropical Storm Narda (2019)

The 2019 Pacific hurricane season was an event in the annual cycle of tropical cyclone formation, in which tropical cyclones form in the eastern Pacific Ocean. The season officially started on May 15 in the eastern Pacific—east of 140°W—and June 1 in the central Pacific—between the International Date Line and 140°W, and ended on November 30. These dates conventionally delimit the period of each year when most tropical cyclones form in the eastern Pacific basin.

This timeline documents tropical cyclone formations, strengthening, weakening, landfalls, extratropical transitions, and dissipations during the season. It includes information that was not released throughout the season, meaning that data from post-storm reviews by the National Hurricane Center, such as a storm that was not initially warned upon, has been included.

The time stamp for each event is first stated using Coordinated Universal Time (UTC), the 24-hour clock where 00:00 = midnight UTC. The NHC uses both UTC and the time zone where the center of the tropical cyclone is currently located. The time zones utilized (east to west) are: Central, Mountain, Pacific and Hawaii. In this timeline, the respective area time is included in parentheses. Additionally, figures for maximum sustained winds and position estimates are rounded to the nearest 5 units (miles, or kilometers), following National Hurricane Center practice. Direct wind observations are rounded to the nearest whole number. Atmospheric pressures are listed to the nearest millibar and nearest hundredth of an inch of mercury.

== Timeline ==
=== May ===
May 15

- The 2019 Eastern Pacific hurricane season officially begins.

=== June ===
June 1

- The 2019 Central Pacific hurricane season officially begins.

June 25

- 21:00 UTC (4:00 p.m. CDT) at 15.2°N 105.7°W – Tropical Depression One-E forms about 280 mi (450 km) southwest of Manzanillo, Mexico.

June 26

- 15:00 UTC (9:00 a.m. MDT) at 14.7°N 109.4°W – Tropical Depression One-E intensifies into Tropical Storm Alvin roughly 450 mi (720 km) southwest of Manzanillo, Mexico.

June 28

- 03:00 UTC (8:00 p.m. PDT June 27) at 17.4°N 115.4°W – Tropical Storm Alvin strengthens into a Category 1 hurricane roughly 520 mi (840 km) southwest of the southern tip of the Baja California Peninsula. Simultaneously, Alvin achieves peak intensity with 1-minute sustained winds of 75 mph (121 km/h) and a minimum pressure of 992 mbar (29.29 inHg).
- 09:00 UTC (2:00 a.m. PDT) at 18.0°N 116.3°W – Hurricane Alvin weakens back to a tropical storm about 535 mi (861 km) southwest of the southern tip of the Baja California Peninsula.

June 29

- 09:00 UTC (2:00 a.m. PDT) at 20.3°N 119.9°W – Tropical Storm Alvin weakens further to a tropical depression about 665 mi (1,070 km) west-southwest of the southern tip of the Baja California Peninsula.
- 15:00 UTC (8:00 a.m. PDT) at 20.7°N 120.5°W – Tropical Depression Alvin degenerates into a post-tropical cyclone about 695 mi (1,118 km) west of the southern tip of the Baja California Peninsula.

June 30

- 15:00 UTC (9:00 a.m. MDT) at 10.6°N 110.4°W – Tropical Storm Barbara forms from a tropical wave roughly 850 mi (1,370 km) south of the southern tip of the Baja California Peninsula.

=== July ===
July 1

- 21:00 UTC (2:00 p.m. PDT) at 11.5°N 118.5°W – Tropical Storm Barbara strengthens into a Category 1 hurricane roughly 970 mi (1,560 km) southwest of the southern tip of Baja California.

July 2

- 03:00 UTC (8:00 p.m. PDT July 1) at 11.7°N 119.8°W – Hurricane Barbara rapidly strengthens into a Category 2 hurricane roughly 1,010 mi (1,630 km) southwest of the southern tip of Baja California.
- 12:30 UTC (2:30 a.m. HST) at 12.3°N 121.6°W – Hurricane Barbara rapidly strengthens into a Category 4 hurricane roughly 1,060 mi (1,710 km) southwest of the southern tip of Baja California, bypassing Category 3 status entirely.

July 3

- 03:00 UTC (5:00 p.m. HST July 2) at 13.1°N 124.6°W – Hurricane Barbara reaches its peak intensity with sustained winds of 155 mph (249 km/h) and a minimum pressure of 930 mbar (27 inHg) roughly 1,175 mi (1,891 km) southwest of the southern tip of Baja California.

July 4

- 09:00 UTC (11:00 p.m. HST July 2) at 15.4°N 129.2°W – Hurricane Barbara weakens into a category 3 hurricane about 1,360 mi (2,190 km) west-southwest of the southern tip of Baja California.
- 21:00 UTC (11:00 a.m. HST) at 16.7°N 129.2°W – Hurricane Barbara weakens into a category 2 hurricane about 1,420 mi (2,290 km) west-southwest of the southern tip of Baja California.

July 5

- 09:00 UTC (11:00 p.m. HST July 4) at 17.7°N 132.6°W – Hurricane Barbara weakens into a category 1 hurricane about 1,475 mi (2,374 km) west-southwest of the southern tip of Baja California.
- 15:00 UTC (5:00 a.m. HST) at 18.4°N 133.6°W – Hurricane Barbara weakens into a tropical storm about 1,360 mi (2,190 km) west of the southern tip of Baja California.

July 6

- 15:00 UTC (5:00 a.m. HST) at 18.7°N 139.2°W – Tropical Storm Barbara becomes a post-tropical cyclone about 1,040 mi (1,670 km) east of Hilo, Hawaii.
- 15:00 UTC (8:00 a.m. PDT) at 15.6°N 115.7°W – Tropical Storm Cosme forms roughly 630 mi (1,010 km) southwest of the southern tip of the Baja California Peninsula.
- 21:00 UTC (2:00 p.m. PDT) at 16.2°N 116.3°W – Tropical Storm Cosme reaches its peak intensity of maximum sustained winds of 50 mph (80 km/h) and a minimum barometric pressure of 1,001 mbar (29.6 inHg) roughly 620 mi (1,000 km) southwest of the southern tip of the Baja California Peninsula.

July 8

- 03:00 UTC (8:00 p.m. PDT July 7) at 19.1°N 119.5°W – Tropical Storm Cosme weakens to a tropical depression roughly 670 mi (1,080 km) west-southwest of the southern tip of the Baja California Peninsula.
- 15:00 UTC (8:00 a.m. PDT) at 20.5°N 120.7°W – Tropical Storm Cosme degenerates into a post-tropical remnant low roughly 710 mi (1,140 km) west of the southern tip of the Baja California Peninsula.

July 12

- 21:00 UTC (3:00 p.m. MDT) at 15.1°N 107.5°W – Tropical Depression Four-E forms about 340 mi (550 km) southwest of Manzanillo, Mexico.

July 14

- 15:00 UTC (8:00 a.m. PDT) at 18.4°N 115.7°W – Tropical Depression Four-E degenerates into a remnant low about 485 mi (781 km) southwest of the southern tip of the Baja California Peninsula.

July 22

- 09:00 UTC (2:00 p.m. PDT) at 15.0°N 116.2°W – Tropical Depression Five-E forms about 685 mi (1,102 km) southwest of the southern tip of the Baja California Peninsula.

July 23

- 09:00 UTC (2:00 a.m. PDT) at 18.0°N 117.3°W – Tropical Depression Five-E strengthens into Tropical Storm Dalila about 585 mi (941 km) southwest of the southern tip of the Baja California Peninsula.

July 24

- 09:00 UTC (2:00 a.m. PDT) at 19.8°N 118.8°W – Tropical Storm Dalila weakens into a tropical depression about 610 mi (980 km) southwest of the southern tip of the Baja California Peninsula.

July 25

- 15:00 UTC (8:00 a.m. PDT) at 21.9°N 120.8°W – Tropical Depression Dalila degenerates into a remnant low about 700 mi (1,100 km) west of the southern tip of the Baja California Peninsula.

July 27

- 15:00 UTC (5:00 a.m. HST) at 11.3°N 123.8°W – Tropical Depression Six-E forms from a tropical wave roughly 2,160 mi (3,480 km) east of Hilo, Hawaii.
- 21:15 UTC (2:15 p.m. PDT) at 11.6°N 125.3°W – Tropical Depression Six-E strengthens into Tropical Storm Erick roughly 2,055 mi (3,307 km) east of Hilo, Hawaii.

July 28

- 15:00 UTC (9:00 a.m. MDT) at 11.2°N 107.5°W – Tropical Depression Seven-E forms roughly 580 mi (930 km) south-southwest of Manzanillo, Mexico.

July 29

- 09:00 UTC (11:00 p.m. HST July 28) at 12.5°N 113.0°W – Tropical Depression Seven-E intensifies into Tropical Storm Flossie roughly 730 mi (1,170 km) southwest of Manzanillo, Mexico.

July 30

- 03:00 UTC (5:00 p.m. HST July 29) at 12.7°N 140.0°W – Tropical Storm Erick becomes a hurricane roughly 1,110 mi (1,790 km) east-southeast of Hilo, Hawaii.
- 15:00 UTC (5:00 a.m. HST) at 13.4°N 142.8°W – Erick becomes a major hurricane roughly 920 mi (1,480 km) east-southeast of Hilo, Hawaii.
- 21:00 UTC (11:00 a.m. HST) at 13.6°N 144.1°W – Erick becomes a Category 4 hurricane roughly 840 mi (1,350 km) east-southeast of Hilo, Hawaii.
- 21:00 UTC (11:00 a.m. HST) at 12.3°N 121.3°W – Tropical Storm Flossie becomes a hurricane roughly 1,045 mi (1,682 km) southwest of the southern tip of Baja California.

July 31

- 03:00 UTC (5:00 p.m. HST July 30) at 12.8°N 122.6°W – Flossie reaches its peak intensity with maximum sustained winds of 80 mph (130 km/h) and a minimum barometric pressure of 989 mbar (29.2 inHg) roughly 1,085 mi (1,746 km) southwest of the southern tip of Baja California.
- 09:00 UTC (11:00 p.m. HST July 30) at 14.2°N 146.3°W – Hurricane Erick weakens to category 3 intensity roughly 695 mi (1,118 km) east-southeast of Hilo, Hawaii.
- 21:00 UTC (11:00 a.m. HST) at 14.0°N 127.3°W – Hurricane Flossie weakens to a tropical storm roughly 1,295 mi (2,084 km) west-southwest of the southern tip of Baja California.

=== August ===
August 1

- 03:00 UTC (5:00 p.m. HST July 31) at 15.1°N 149.6°W – Erick weakens to a category 2 hurricane roughly 480 mi (770 km) southeast of Hilo, Hawaii.
- 09:00 UTC (11:00 p.m. HST July 31) at 15.5°N 150.9°W – Erick weakens to category 1 intensity roughly 400 mi (640 km) southeast of Hilo, Hawaii.

August 2

- 03:00 UTC (5:00 p.m. HST August 1) at 15.9°N 154.5°W – Hurricane Erick weakens to a tropical storm roughly 265 mi (426 km) south of Hilo, Hawaii.

August 3

- 15:00 UTC (8:00 a.m. PDT) at 14.7°N 121.2°W – Tropical Depression Eight-E forms about 930 mi (1,500 km) southwest of the southern tip of Baja California.
- 15:00 UTC (8:00 a.m. PDT) at 15.0°N 122.4°W – Tropical Depression Eight-E strengthens into Tropical Storm Gil about 980 mi (1,580 km) west-southwest of the southern tip of Baja California.

August 4

- 03:00 UTC (5:00 p.m. HST August 3) at 17.9°N 165.2°W – Tropical Storm Erick weakens into a tropical depression roughly 530 mi (850 km) west-southwest of Honolulu, Hawaii.
- 09:00 UTC (2:00 a.m. PDT) at 14.9°N 124.4°W – Gil weakens into a tropical depression about 1,095 mi (1,762 km) west-southwest of the southern tip of Baja California.

August 5

- 03:00 UTC (8:00 p.m. PDT August 4) at 15.1°N 127.3°W – Gil degenerates into a remnant low about 1,255 mi (2,020 km) west-southwest of the southern tip of Baja California.
- 03:00 UTC (5:00 p.m. HST August 4) at 18.9°N 149.8°W – Tropical Storm Flossie degenerates into a tropical depression roughly 350 mi (560 km) east of Hilo, Hawaii.
- 03:00 UTC (5:00 p.m. HST August 4) at 19.2°N 169.1°W – Tropical Depression Erick degenerates into a remnant low roughly 175 mi (282 km) north of Johnston Island.

August 6

- 03:00 UTC (5:00 p.m. HST August 5) at 20.8°N 154.6°W – Flossie degenerates into a remnant low roughly 85 mi (137 km) north-northeast of Hilo, Hawaii.

August 12

- 03:00 UTC (9:00 p.m. MDT August 11) at 18.9°N 109.8°W – Tropical Depression Nine-E forms from a tropical wave about 275 mi (443 km) south of the southern tip of Baja California.
- 09:00 UTC (3:00 a.m. MDT) at 19.5°N 110.9°W – Tropical Depression Nine-E strengthens into Tropical Storm Henriette about 245 mi (394 km) south-southwest of the southern tip of Baja California.

August 13

- 09:00 UTC (2:00 a.m. PDT) at 21.1°N 115.2°W – Henriette degenerates into a depression about 360 mi (580 km) west-southwest of the southern tip of Baja California.
- 15:00 UTC (8:00 a.m. PDT) at 21.4°N 116.1°W – Henriette degenerates into a post-tropical remnant low about 410 mi (660 km) west-southwest of the southern tip of Baja California.

August 21

- 15:00 UTC (9:00 a.m. MDT) at 15.4°N 107.3°W – Tropical Depression Ten-E forms from a low-pressure area roughly 545 mi (877 km) south-southeast of the southern tip of Baja California.
- 21:00 UTC (3:00 p.m. MDT) at 15.8°N 109.5°W – Tropical Depression Ten-E strengthens into Tropical Storm Ivo roughly 490 mi (790 km) south of the southern tip of Baja California.

August 23

- 16:00 UTC (9:00 a.m. PDT) at 18.9°N 115.0°W – Tropical Storm Ivo reaches its peak intensity with maximum sustained winds of 70 mph (110 km/h) and a minimum barometric pressure of 990 mbar (29 inHg) roughly 430 mi (690 km) southwest of the southern tip of Baja California.

August 25

- 09:00 UTC (2:00 a.m. PDT) at 24.5°N 117.0°W – Tropical Storm Ivo weakens into a tropical depression roughly 460 mi (740 km) west-northwest of the southern tip of Baja California.
- 21:00 UTC (2:00 p.m. PDT) at 26.0°N 117.9°W – Tropical Storm Ivo degenerates into a remnant low roughly 545 mi (877 km) west-northwest of the southern tip of Baja California.

=== September ===
September 1

- 09:00 UTC (3:00 a.m. MDT) at 13.2°N 107.6°W – Tropical Storm Juliette forms from a tropical wave roughly 455 mi (732 km) south-southwest of Manzanillo, Mexico and about 685 mi (1,102 km) south-southeast of the southern tip of Baja California.

September 2

- 21:00 UTC (3:00 p.m. MDT) at 17.2°N 113.3°W – Tropical Storm Juliette becomes a Category 1 hurricane roughly 450 mi (720 km) south-southwest of the southern tip of Baja California.

September 3

- 03:00 UTC (9:00 p.m. MDT September 2) at 17.8°N 114.0°W – Hurricane Juliette rapidly intensifies to Category 3 status roughly 440 mi (710 km) southwest of the southern tip of Baja California.
- 15:00 UTC (8:00 a.m. PDT) at 18.4°N 115.0°W – Hurricane Juliette reaches its peak intensity with sustained winds of 125 mph (201 km/h) and a central pressure of 953 mbar (28.1 inHg) roughly 455 mi (732 km) southwest of the southern tip of Baja California.

September 4

- 09:00 UTC (2:00 a.m. PDT) at 19.1°N 116.4°W – Hurricane Juliette weakens to Category 2 status roughly 495 mi (797 km) west-southwest of the southern tip of Baja California.
- 15:00 UTC (5:00 a.m. HST) at 13.2°N 140.5°W – Tropical Depression Twelve-E forms roughly 1,085 mi (1,746 km) east-southeast of South Point, Hawaii.

September 5

- 03:00 UTC (8:00 p.m. PDT September 4) at 19.8°N 118.5°W – Hurricane Juliette weakens to Category 1 status roughly 595 mi (958 km) west-southwest of the southern tip of Baja California.
- 23:00 UTC (1:00 p.m. HST) at 12.2°N 144.8°W – Tropical Depression Twelve-E strengthens into Tropical Storm Akoni roughly 855 mi (1,376 km) southeast of Hilo, Hawaii.

September 6

- 15:00 UTC (5:00 p.m. HST) at 11.2°N 149.7°W – Tropical Storm Akoni degenerates into a remnant low roughly 690 mi (1,110 km) south-southeast of Hilo, Hawaii.
- 21:00 UTC (11:00 a.m. HST) at 23.4°N 124.9°W – Hurricane Juliette weakens to a tropical storm roughly 955 mi (1,537 km) west of the southern tip of Baja California.

September 7

- 21:00 UTC (11:00 a.m. HST) at 24.4°N 129.5°W – Tropical Storm Juliette degenerates into a remnant low roughly 1,245 mi (2,004 km) west of the southern tip of Baja California.

September 12

- 15:00 UTC (9:00 a.m. MDT) at 15.9°N 111.1°W – Tropical Depression Thirteen-E forms roughly 490 mi (790 km) south of the southern tip of Baja California.
- 21:00 UTC (3:00 p.m. MDT) at 16.1°N 112.2°W – Tropical Depression Thirteen-E intensifies into Tropical Storm Kiko roughly 495 mi (797 km) south-southwest of the southern tip of Baja California.

September 14

- 21:00 UTC (2:00 p.m. PDT) at 17.1°N 119.3°W – Tropical Storm Kiko strengthens into a Category 1 hurricane roughly 730 mi (1,170 km) west-southwest of the southern tip of Baja California.

September 15

- 00:30 UTC (5:30 p.m. PDT September 14) at 17.0°N 117.9°W – Hurricane Kiko rapidly intensifies into a high-end Category 2 hurricane roughly 760 mi (1,220 km) west-southwest of the southern tip of Baja California.
- 03:00 UTC (8:00 p.m. PDT September 14) at 17.0°N 120.1°W – Kiko becomes a major hurricane roughly 775 mi (1,247 km) west-southwest of the southern tip of Baja California.

=== November ===
November 30

- The 2019 Pacific hurricane season officially ends.

== See also ==
- List of Pacific hurricanes
- Timeline of the 2019 Atlantic hurricane season
- Tropical cyclones in 2019
