= Tropical Storm Olga (2019) =

Atlantic tropical storm

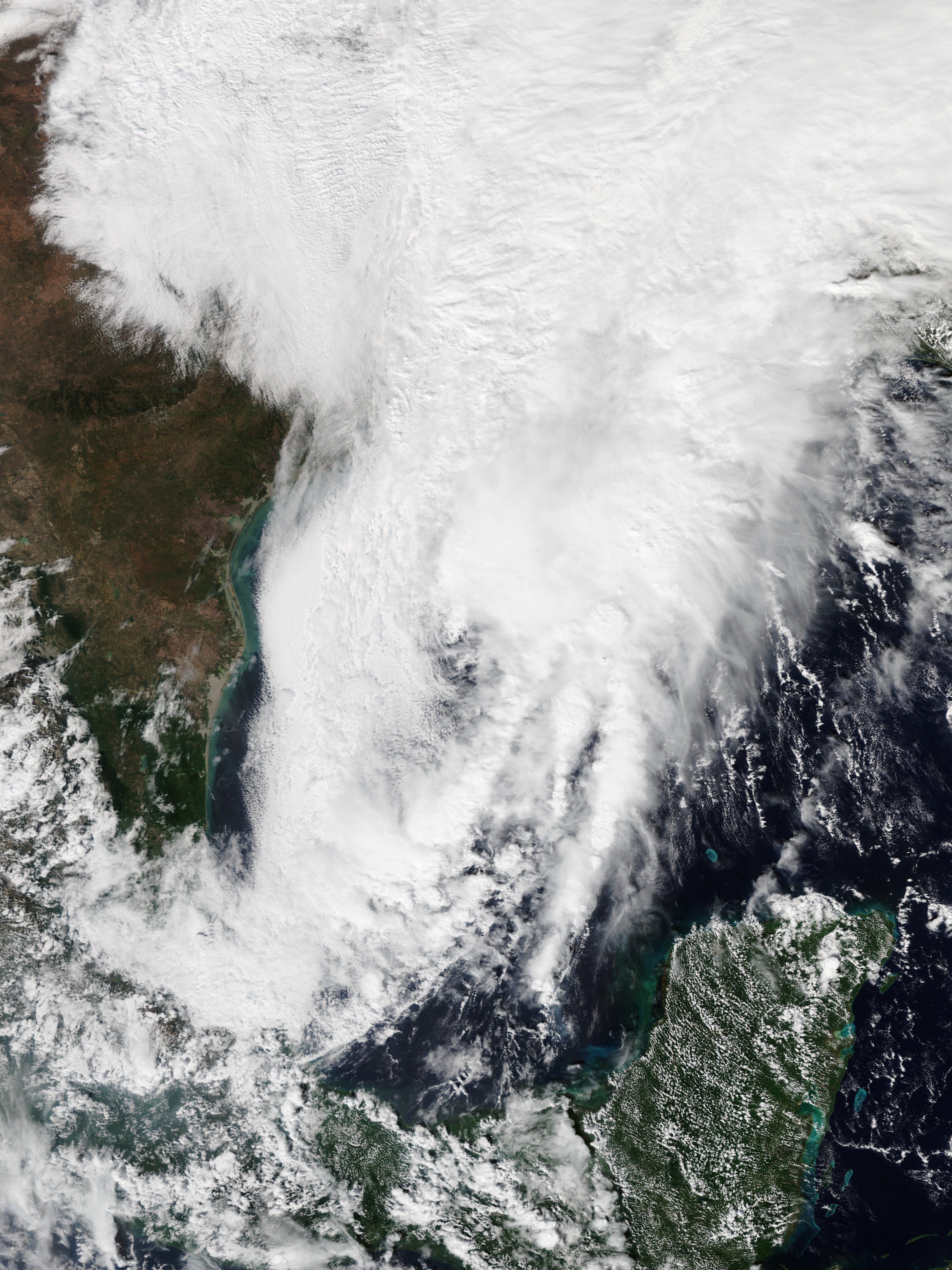
- Tropical Storm Olga in the Gulf of Mexico on October 25

Meteorological history
- Formed: October 25, 2019
- Extratropical: October 25, 2019
- Dissipated: October 27, 2019

Tropical storm
- 1-minute sustained (SSHWS/NWS)
- Highest winds: 45 mph (75 km/h)
- Lowest pressure: 998 mbar (hPa); 29.47 inHg

Overall effects
- Fatalities: 2 indirect
- Damage: $400 million (2019 USD)
- Areas affected: Central United States, Great Lakes region
- IBTrACS
- Part of the 2019 Atlantic hurricane season

Tropical Storm Olga was a short-lived tropical cyclone that caused unexpected severe damage as a non-tropical system along its track across the Central United States in late October 2019. The storm began as a distinct tropical wave that moved off Africa on October 8 and organized into a tropical storm over the Bay of Campeche early on October 25. It moved north-northeast, transitioning into an extratropical cyclone within 12 hours. The remnants of the cyclone made landfall in central Louisiana early on October 26 and continued across the Eastern United States and into Ontario, where it dissipated on October 28.

The severity of the storm along its track from Louisiana through Tennessee caught meteorologists by surprise. Intense winds inflicted severe damage, and downed numerous trees onto homes, vehicles, and roadways. In Louisiana, power was cut to 132,000 customers statewide. A peak rainfall accumulation total of 10.24 in (260 mm) was observed near Ponchatoula, with lesser amounts across the state. The remnants of the storm continued into Mississippi, where 772 homes were damaged or lost, 26 businesses impacted, and 27 roads damaged or destroyed; effects were particularly severe in Tupelo. At least 154,000 power outages were reported across the state; in the storm's wake there, a 34-year-old man was killed cleaning tree debris, although this death was not acknowledged by the National Hurricane Center (NHC) in its Tropical Cyclone Report. In Tennessee, a wide swath of winds up to 96 mph (154 km/h) resulted in nearly 65,000 power outages that forced school closures for up to two weeks in several counties, and a 63-year-old man was killed by a downed tree. Total damage along the path of the cyclone was estimated at $400 million.

== Meteorological history ==
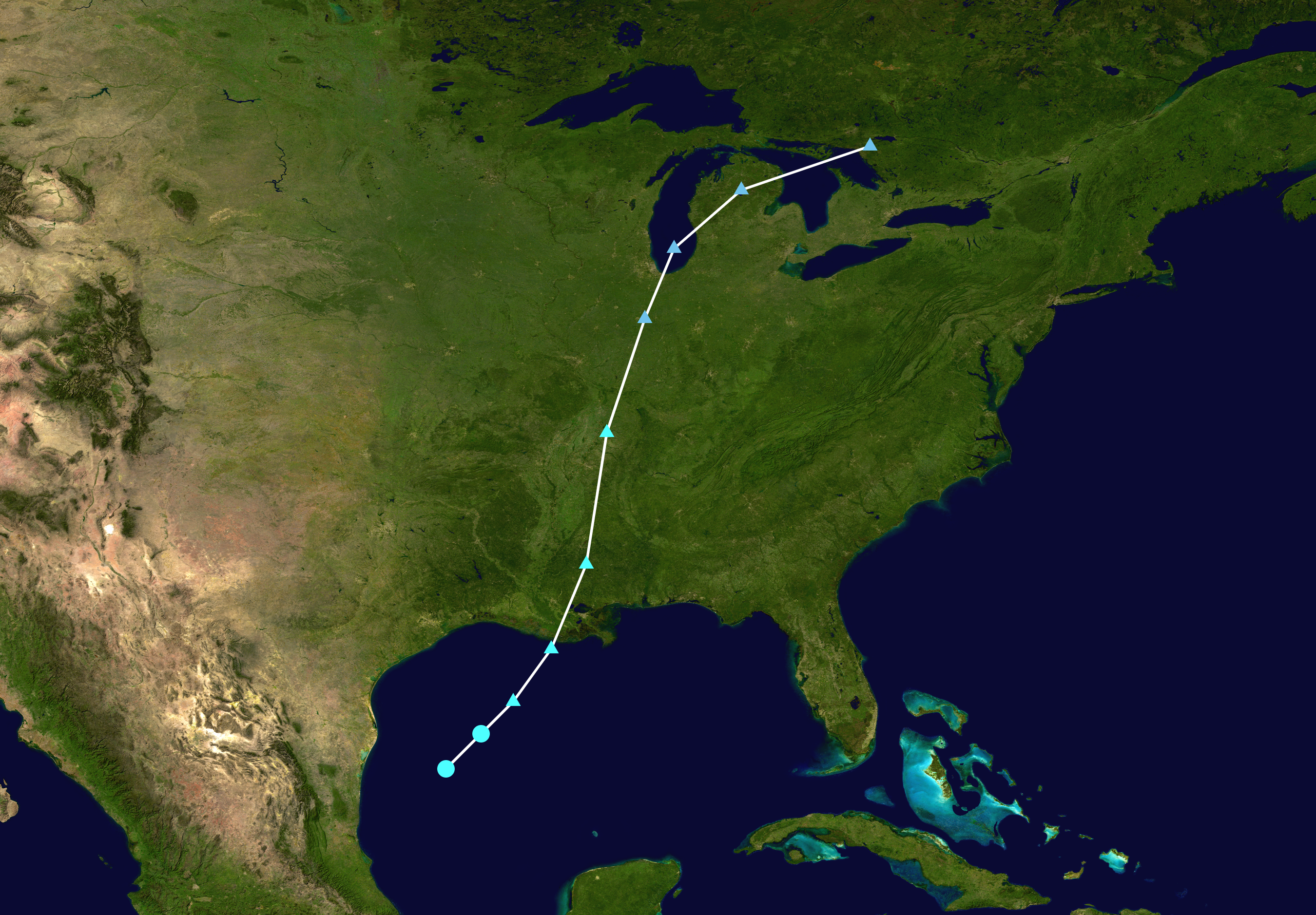
Map plotting the storm's track and intensity, according to the Saffir–Simpson scale Map key Saffir–Simpson scale Tropical depression (≤38 mph, ≤62 km/h) Tropical storm (39–73 mph, 63–118 km/h) Category 1 (74–95 mph, 119–153 km/h) Category 2 (96–110 mph, 154–177 km/h) Category 3 (111–129 mph, 178–208 km/h) Category 4 (130–156 mph, 209–251 km/h) Category 5 (≥157 mph, ≥252 km/h) Unknown Storm type Tropical cyclone Subtropical cyclone Extratropical cyclone, remnant low, tropical disturbance, or monsoon depression

A well-organized tropical wave moved off the western coastline of Africa on October 8. High wind shear across the tropical Atlantic hampered the wave from developing into a tropical cyclone even as it showed intermittent signs of convective organization. The disturbance progressed into the eastern Caribbean Sea on October 17 and reached Central America five days later. After crossing the Yucatán Peninsula into the Bay of Campeche by October 24, the wave spawned a broad area of low pressure. The diffuse circulation became better defined the next morning, when satellite-derived wind data indicated it was already producing gale-force winds. As such, the NHC estimated that the system became a tropical storm at 12:00 UTC on October 25 when it was about 390 miles (630 km) south-southwest of Lake Charles, Louisiana. Operationally, the first advisory on the storm was issued three hours later and it was assessed and designated as Tropical Depression Seventeen rather than a tropical storm; it was upgraded to Tropical Storm Olga six hours later. The system's cloud pattern was characterized by a large cluster of deep thunderstorm activity within the northeastern quadrant. A broad upper-level trough to the west of the newly formed cyclone directed it on a general northeastward course.

Shortly after the time of formation, a reconnaissance aircraft found that a cold front was already impinging on Olga's circulation, while maximum sustained winds had increased to 45 mph (72 km/h) (operationally, the maximum winds were assessed to be 40 mph (64 km/h)); slightly stronger winds trailed the frontal boundary. However, since the boundary had not yet moved through the system's circulation, Olga persisted as a tropical cyclone. The final passes conducted by the reconnaissance aircraft a few hours later found strong northwesterly flow and a sharp gradient in temperature and dew point near the center that had either been overtaken by the front or become poorly defined. As such, Olga transitioned into an extratropical cyclone by 00:00 UTC on October 26, with winds of 50 mph (80 km/h) as the earlier measurements behind the front became representative of the overall system. It was positioned roughly 225 miles (362 km) south-southeast of Lake Charles at the time. The cyclone continued north-northeast and crossed the southeastern Louisiana coastline around 07:00 UTC. It progressed inland across the Eastern United States, crossed Lake Huron, and finally dissipated over southeastern Ontario by 00:00 UTC on October 28.

== Preparations and impact ==
The National Hurricane Center did not issue tropical cyclone warnings and watches along the Gulf Coast of the United States, as they expected Olga to become a post-tropical cyclone prior to landfall. However, local weather forecast offices of the National Weather Service laid in place gale warnings and coastal flood advisories among other hazard messages. Nearly 8 million residents throughout the Southern United States were placed under flash flood watches. In advance of Olga's remnants in Terrebonne Parish, Louisiana, all floodgates and flood control systems were closed to prevent major flooding. New Orleans lifted parking restrictions on neutral grounds and sidewalks, allowing citizens to move their vehicles to higher ground in advance of the anticipated heavy rainfall. Along the entirety of its path, the remnants of Olga caused approximately $400 million in damage.

=== Louisiana ===
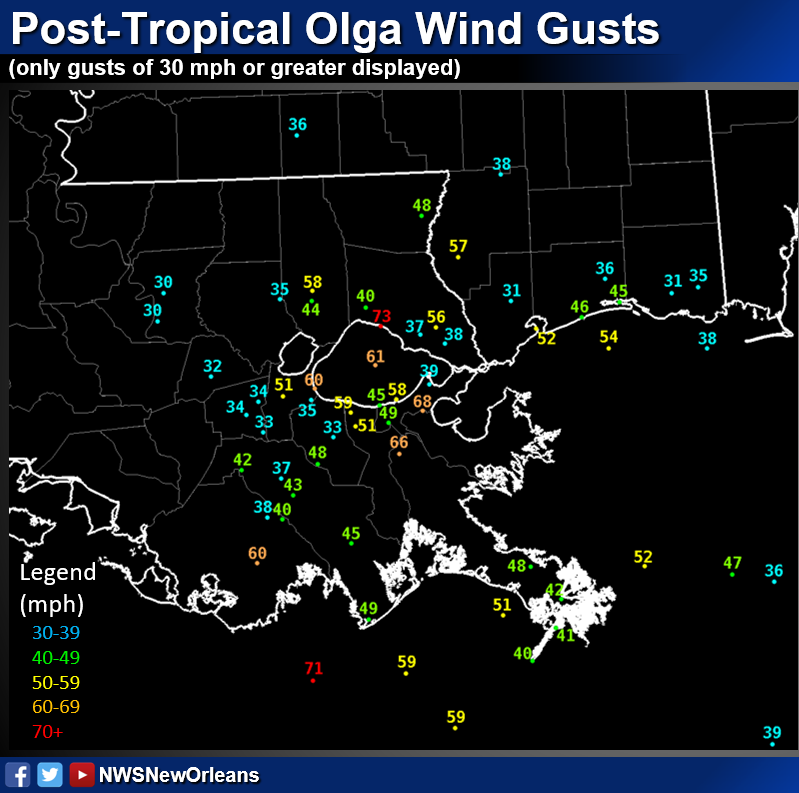
Select wind gusts across southeastern Louisiana and southern Mississippi

Tropical storm-force winds overspread much of southeastern Louisiana, with a maximum statewide gust of 73 mph (117 km/h) in Mandeville. These winds were short in duration as the remnants of Olga moved rapidly north-northeast, but the severity of the storm caught meteorologists and local officials off guard. The New Orleans and Lake Charles branches of the National Weather Service expressed their intention to further study the event in order to better prepare for similar systems in the future. The energy companies Entergy and Cleco reported damage to 260 and 35 power poles, respectively; Entergy reported the most significant damage throughout New Orleans and Hammond. Gusty winds at the Louis Armstrong New Orleans International Airport caused two separate electrical disruptions, resulting in the delay or cancellation of multiple flights; citywide, power outages were estimated around 17,000. At the nearby Voodoo Music + Arts Experience, events were delayed to allow recovery from storm damage. A 25 ft (7.6 m) tall LED video wall was blown down and saw its plastic panels shattered. The Jazz Half marathon was also delayed until later in the morning. High winds damaged the perimeter fencing at the site of the Hard Rock Hotel collapse. Statewide, the number of power outages peaked around 132,000 customers, principally in Tangipahoa Parish. About 92,000 of those outages were among Entergy customers while the other 40,000 were associated with Cleco.

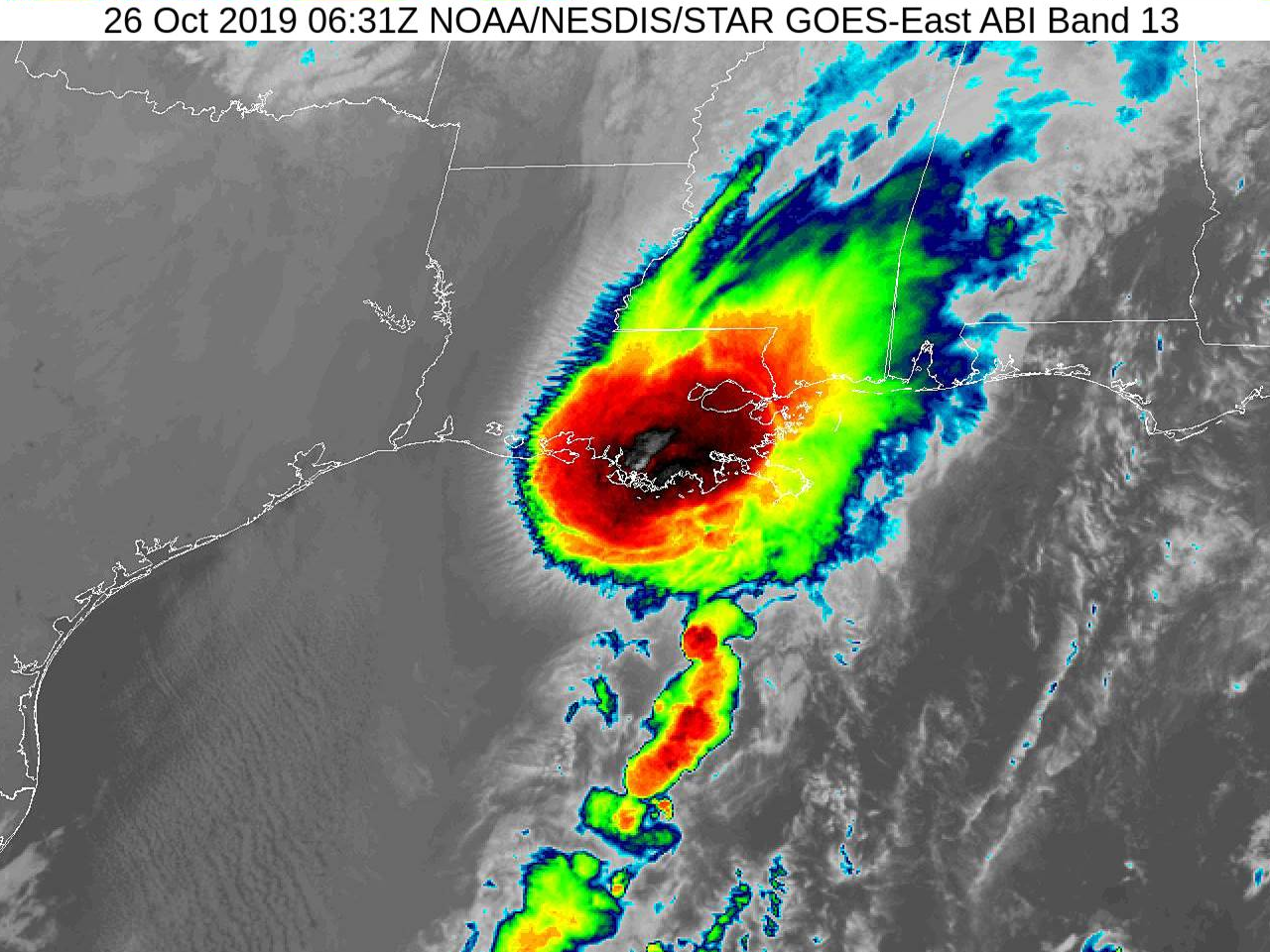
Satellite image of the remnants of Olga near landfall in Louisiana on October 26

The remnants of Olga also produced heavy rainfall, with a peak statewide accumulation of 10.24 in (260 mm) to the east of Ponchatoula. Local amounts of 10–14 in (250–360 mm) overspread Terrebonne Parish, while more widespread accumulations of 6–8 in (150–200 mm) were recorded in portions of that parish northeastward into Washington Parish. At the height of the storm, flash flood emergencies were issued for Terrebonne and Lafourche parishes. The heavy rainfall brought challenges for sugarcane farmers who had already suffered in the wake of several heavy rainfall events in years past. In spite of this fact, dry soil conditions in the lead-up to Olga's remnants alleviated concerns about river flooding. Only a few rivers reached flood stage and mainly minor flooding was reported across the state. Water levels of 2–3 ft (0.61–0.91 m) above normal in southeastern Louisiana did cause minor coastal flooding there, including across the Mandeville Lakefront along the northern shore of Lake Pontchartrain. Coastal flooding of 1–2 ft (0.30–0.61 m) affected the central Louisiana coastline around high tide. Precipitation associated with Olga contributed to the second wettest year on record at New Orleans International Airport, after 1985.

=== Mississippi ===
The strongest measured winds in relation to the remnants of Olga throughout the Eastern United States were observed in Mississippi. A storm chaser recorded a peak, hurricane-force wind gust of 74 mph (119 km/h) near Ripley. These strong winds downed countless trees, some up to 3 ft (0.91 m) in diameter, and caused extensive damage to structures and power lines across a 150 mi (240 km) swath through Mississippi and into Tennessee. A 34-year-old man was killed on Highway 489 in Newton County when a tree fell on him as he cleaned up tree debris, although this was death was not included in the NHC's final report. Union and Tippah counties each saw twenty roads closed by fallen trees and lines. Four roads were also closed in Pontotoc County, where two tractor trailer trucks were overturned on US 278. Roofing was ripped from houses, siding was torn from manufactured homes, and road signs were toppled. Statewide, 772 homes were lost or damaged, 26 businesses were affected, and 27 roads were damaged or destroyed. At the height of the storm, at least 154,000 power outages were reported.

Radar imagery of the remnants of Olga in northern Mississippi

Disruption to the electrical grid was particularly severe around Tupelo. One of the main power providers, Tombigbee Electric Power Association, estimated over 19,000 residents were without power at one point. Seventeen of the company's nineteen power substations suffered damage. Tupelo Water & Light reported at least 25 power poles were downed. Tupelo mayor Jason Shelton was trapped in his home and subsequently transferred to the hospital for injuries after a tree was downed on his home. The former city automotive museum suffered structural damage when the outer wall of the storage portion of the building collapsed. A fire station and car dealership were also damaged. Farther north, Alcorn County also recorded widespread damage. About 16,000 people were without power at the storm's worst, and 50 residences remained without power even nine days later. A state of emergency was declared, and schools throughout the county for closed for one day. Similar school closures were recorded across Prentiss and Alcorn counties. 4-County Electric Power Association reported more than 700 customers without power, mainly in Choctaw County, while the East Mississippi Electric Power Association documented an additional 500 in Winston County, and Prentiss County noted 700 more. Natchez Trace Electric Power Association, meanwhile, worked to restore power to the WTVA and WLOV-TV transmitters, allowing them to resume broadcasting at full power.

The maximum observed storm surge was 3.5 ft (1.1 m) above normal tide levels in Bay St. Louis, Mississippi. The combined effects of storm surge and normal tide rose water levels to 2–3 ft (0.61–0.91 m) above normal along the Mississippi coastline, resulting in minor coastal flooding across Hancock County.

=== Tennessee ===
A long swath of damaging winds that originated in Mississippi continued into Tennessee in McNairy County, where 21 homes were destroyed and an additional 880 were damaged. The hardest hit community in the county was reported to be Adamsville. In nearby, Milledgeville, a 63-year-old man was killed by a fallen tree. In Decatur County, a 300 ft (91 m) AT&T tower buckled and fell north of the county seat of Decaturville. A tree fell on a trailer home in the rural portions of the county, critically injuring a woman. There and in neighboring Benton and Henderson counties, seven tractor trailer trucks were blown off the Interstate 40 bridge over the Tennessee River, prompting a closure of the bridge for several hours. The remnants of Olga intensified across central Tennessee as a 5–10 mi (8.0–16.1 km) swath of severe downburst winds, estimated up to 96 mph (154 km/h), cut across Perry, Houston, Humphreys, and Montgomery counties. The Tennessee Emergency Management Agency estimated that damage throughout those four counties totaled $8.07 million, with $1.07 million in Perry County, $2.41 million in Humphreys County, $500,000 in Houston County, and $4.09 million in Montgomery County. The Meriwether Lewis Electric Cooperative reported that 15,000 of the company's 35,000 meters were disabled by the storm, chiefly in Humphreys County. Extensive damage was reported throughout Clarksville, where 40,000 customers were left without power. Sixty-one utility poles and fifteen electricity transformers were disabled throughout the city, representing a harsher blow to the area than an ice storm in February 1994 and F3 tornado in January 1999. Grandstands at the Clarksville Speedway were toppled, while at the nearby Clarksville–Montgomery County Regional Airport, one hangar experienced a gas leak, several others saw damage, and two runways were closed after runway lights stopped working. Statewide, the number of power outages reached nearly 65,000.

=== Elsewhere ===
Severe weather occurred concurrently with Olga's progression toward the United States Gulf Coast. While initial reports drew a connection between Olga and confirmed tornadoes across southwestern Alabama, meteorologists later established them as separate weather events. Moisture from Olga did, however, stream northward through Tuscaloosa, Alabama, producing an October accumulation record of 6.5 in (170 mm) there. Rainfall associated with Olga and preceding Tropical Storm Nestor contributed to monthly precipitation totals 150–300 percent of average throughout Virginia, the western Carolinas, central Georgia, and western Alabama. This was beneficial to a region suffering from prolonged drought. In Kentucky, winds up to 70 mph (110 km/h) brought down numerous trees onto homes, vehicles, and roadways. Tractor trailers and a recreational vehicle were overturned on Interstate 24. Rainfall accumulations of 2–3 in (51–76 mm) were commonplace across the western portions of the state, with lesser amounts elsewhere. This precipitation alleviated a flash drought (Note: Unlike a traditional drought which is caused by a prolonged period without precipitation, a flash drought consists of a rapid onset of dry, sunny, and hot conditions. The Climate Prediction Center defines a flash drought for an area as the degradation of two drought categories over a four-week period as ranked on the United States Drought Monitor.) from September. Farther north in Ontario, already-high water levels on Lake Erie were exacerbated by strong winds, sustained at 51 mph (82 km/h) and gusting to 65 mph (105 km/h) in Port Colborne. A water rise of at least 7.5 ft (2.3 m) was reported, causing the lake to overflow its banks and cause a number of road closures in Port Dover, Long Point, and Turkey Point. The nearby Niagara River also caused local inundation and road closures as waves up to 20 ft (6.1 m) crested over breakwaters across Fort Erie and Crystal Beach. Rainfall amounts of 1.2–1.6 inches (30–41 mm) were commonplace throughout southern Ontario, highest at 1.7 in (43 mm) on the opposing end of Lake Ontario in Oswego, New York.

== Aftermath ==
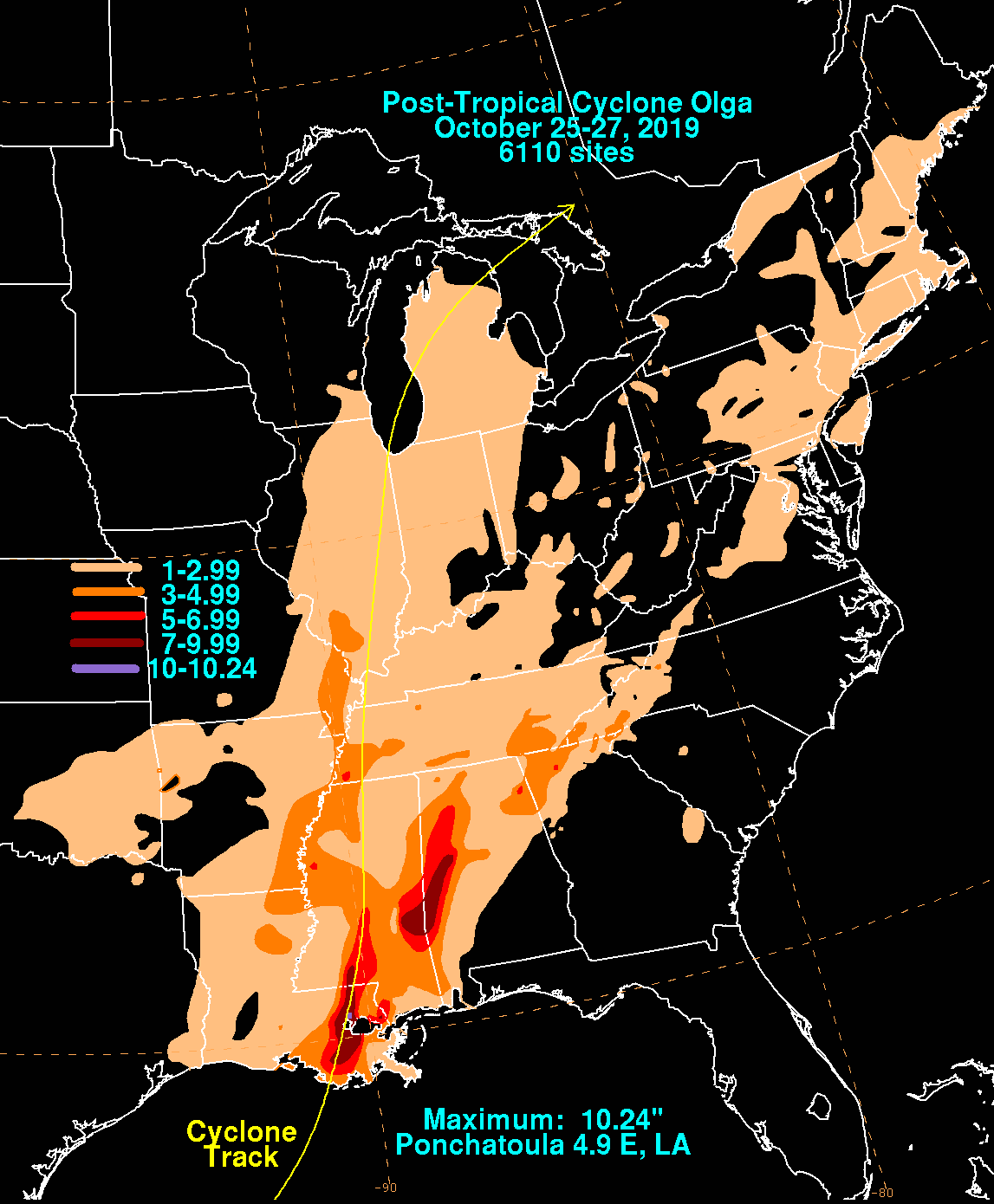
Rainfall associated with the remnants of Olga

In the aftermath of the storm in Louisiana, St. Tammany Parish President Pat Brister issued an emergency declaration. The parish distributed emergency generators to assist water systems that lost power, alleviating concerns about having to boil water in the days following. Residents were directed to place their debris from downed trees on the right side of their roads for crews to collect. Cleco brought in 200 contractors and personnel from unaffected communities to repair damaged equipment, cut trees, and clear limbs from power lines. Entergy, meanwhile, faced questions concerning storm preparedness after customers were left without service for several days. Given Olga's status as a post-tropical cyclone at landfall in Louisiana, some homeowners questioned whether their damages could be filed as a hurricane deductible. Two days after the storm, the Louisiana Department of Children and Family Services announced that Supplemental Nutrition Assistance Program recipients whose homes lost power for at least 24 consecutive hours would be eligible for replacement benefits.

In Mississippi, Tupelo Mayor Jason Shelton signed a proclamation of local emergency, declaring the city a disaster area. Twenty-five workers from four neighboring power associations aided in clean up. Tupelo Public Works engaged in tree debris pick-up along roadways. In Alcorn County, the American Red Cross established a shelter at the convention center to assist those without power; The Salvation Army provided it with food. Even a month later, tree debris continued to litter the streets in the county seat of Corinth. Believing his city did not have sufficient funds to swiftly eliminate storm debris, the alderman looked to outside contractors for help. He planned to open a declaration center within two weeks while working with local church groups to provide for those in need. Ultimately, 11 companies offered support for the clean-up job. Three-quarters of the clean-up cost was handled by the Federal Emergency Management Association. The city of Okolona planned to ask that agency for funds as well, and received $72,000 for repairs in January. The Poplarville School Board of Trustees engaged with Mississippi Power to approve a $40,729 service agreement to repair damaged light poles. Citing widespread and severe damage throughout the state, the Mississippi delegation to the United States Congress—senators Cindy Hyde-Smith and Roger Wicker, and representatives Bennie Thompson, Steven Palazzo, Trent Kelly, and Michael Guest—penned a request to U.S. President Donald Trump for full consideration of Governor Phil Bryant's request for a major federal disaster declaration for 16 counties. This request was approved a day later.

Throughout Tennessee, animal rescues were overwhelmed, especially in the rural counties of the state. Local officials voiced concerns about electrocution, fire risk, and carbon monoxide given the widespread power outages; these concerns were magnified after two people suffered carbon monoxide poisoning while operating generators inside their homes. In McNairy County, the Red Cross set up a shelter to distribute basic necessities. Schools in that county were closed for a week, while the prolonged power outages forced school closures for up to two weeks across Perry, Humphreys, Houston, and Montgomery counties. Eighteen counties across the state were selected by the Small Business Administration for disaster assistance to residents and businesses. The organization announced the opening of disaster-loan outreach centers for citizens to apply for low-interest disaster loans. Over the following months, over 700,000 loans were approved. In early December, senators Lamar Alexander and Marsha Blackburn, alongside representative Mark E. Green, backed Governor Bill Lee's request to President Trump for federal disaster assistance in ten counties. The members of Congress noted in their letter that eight of the ten counties requested for assistance were below the national poverty rate, and they noted the state had already spent $22 million in disaster response to date. The request was approved that week.

== See also ==
- Timeline of the 2019 Atlantic hurricane season
- Other storms of the same name
- Tropical Storm Nestor (2019)
- Tropical Storm Cristobal (2020)
