= Hurricane Ophelia (2017) =

Category 3 Atlantic hurricane

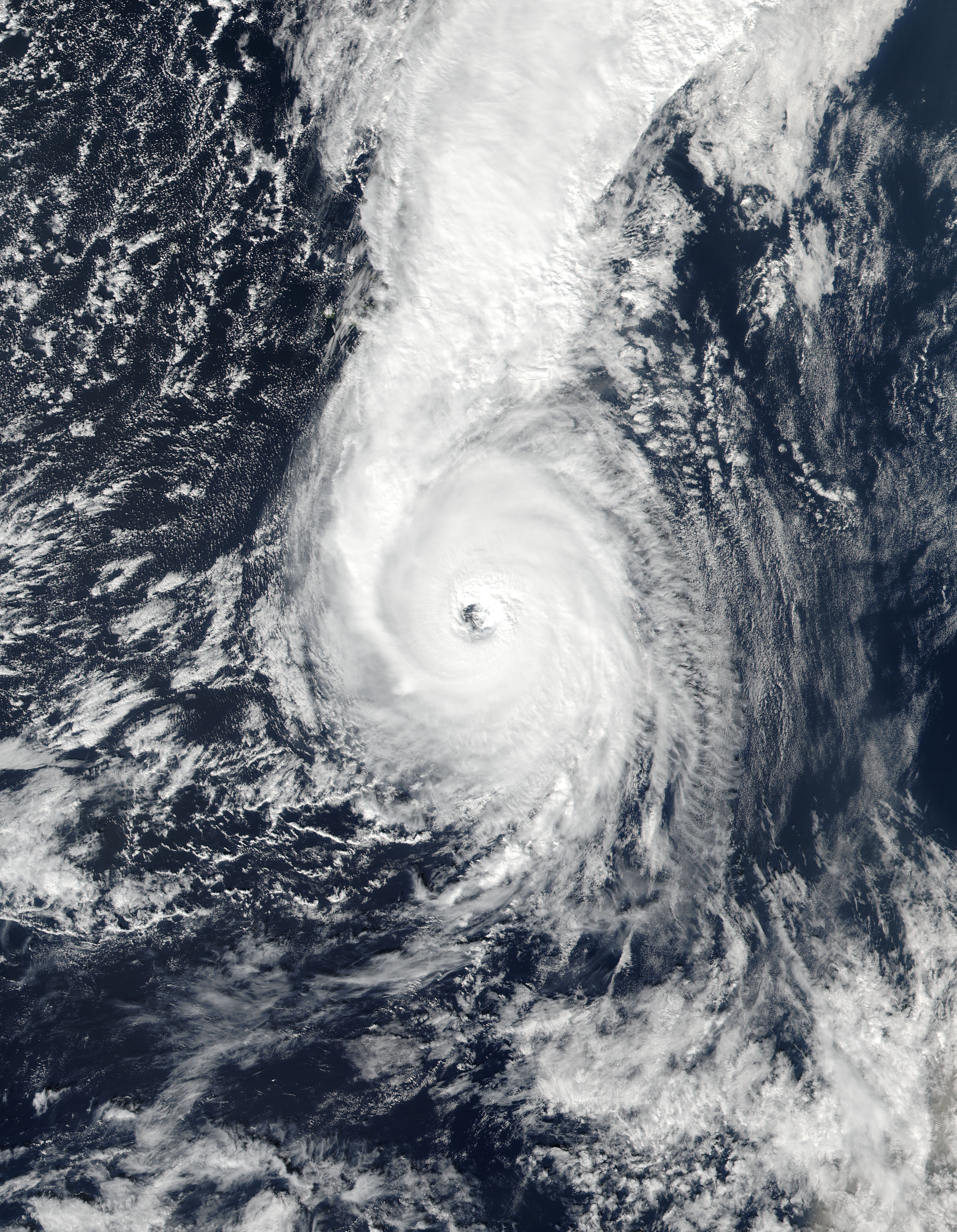
- Hurricane Ophelia at peak intensity south of the Azores on 14 October

Meteorological history
- Formed: 9 October 2017
- Extratropical: 16 October 2017
- Dissipated: 18 October 2017

Category 3 major hurricane
- 1-minute sustained (SSHWS/NWS)
- Highest winds: 115 mph (185 km/h)
- Lowest pressure: 959 mbar (hPa); 28.32 inHg

Overall effects
- Fatalities: 3 indirect
- Damage: $87.7 million (2017 USD)
- Areas affected: Azores, Portugal, Spain, France, Ireland, United Kingdom, Germany, Denmark, Norway, Sweden, Finland, Estonia, and Russia
- IBTrACS
- Part of the 2017 Atlantic hurricane and 2017–18 European windstorm seasons

Hurricane Ophelia, known as Storm Ophelia while extratropical, was regarded as the worst storm to affect Ireland in 50 years, and was also the easternmost Atlantic major hurricane (Note: A major hurricane is a storm that ranks as Category 3 or higher on the Saffir-Simpson hurricane wind scale.) on record. The tenth and final consecutive hurricane and the sixth major hurricane of the very active 2017 Atlantic hurricane season, Ophelia had non-tropical origins from a decaying cold front on 6 October. Located within a favourable environment, the storm steadily strengthened over the next two days, drifting north and then southeastwards before becoming a hurricane on 11 October. After becoming a Category 2 hurricane and fluctuating in intensity for a day, Ophelia intensified into a major hurricane on 14 October south of the Azores, brushing the archipelago with high winds and heavy rainfall. Shortly after achieving peak intensity, Ophelia began weakening as it accelerated over progressively colder waters to its northeast towards Ireland and Great Britain. Completing an extratropical transition early on 16 October, Ophelia became the second storm of the 2017–18 European windstorm season. Early on 17 October, the cyclone crossed the North Sea and struck western Norway, with wind gusts up to 70 kilometres per hour (43 mph) in Rogaland county, before weakening during the evening of 17 October. The system then moved across Scandinavia, before dissipating over Norway on the next day.

Three deaths can be directly attributed to Ophelia, all of which occurred in Ireland. Total losses from the storm were less than initially feared, with a minimum estimate of total insured losses across Ireland and the United Kingdom of US$87.7 million.

== Meteorological history ==
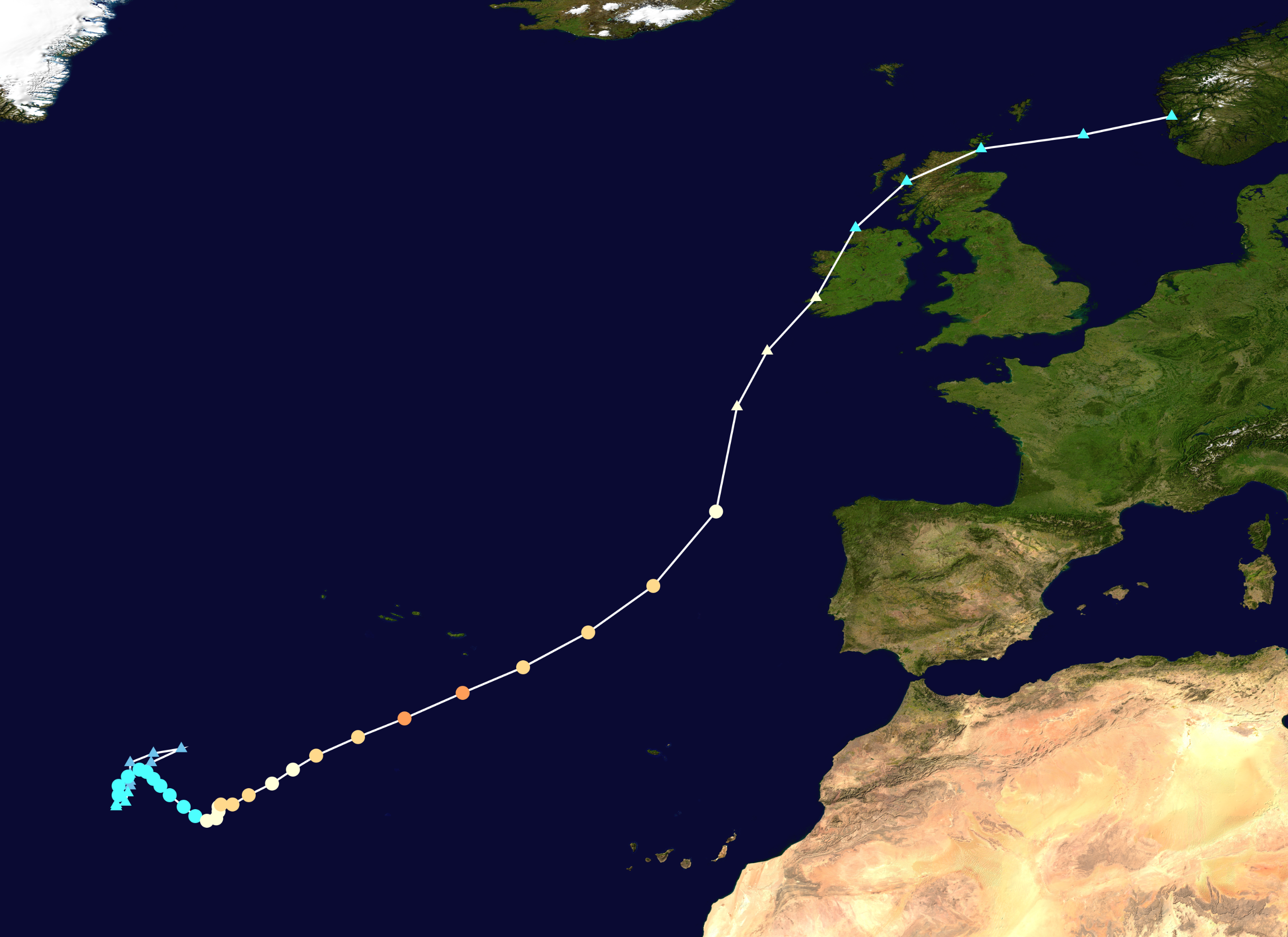
Map plotting the storm's track and intensity, according to the Saffir–Simpson scale Map key Saffir–Simpson scale Tropical depression (≤38 mph, ≤62 km/h) Tropical storm (39–73 mph, 63–118 km/h) Category 1 (74–95 mph, 119–153 km/h) Category 2 (96–110 mph, 154–177 km/h) Category 3 (111–129 mph, 178–208 km/h) Category 4 (130–156 mph, 209–251 km/h) Category 5 (≥157 mph, ≥252 km/h) Unknown Storm type Tropical cyclone Subtropical cyclone Extratropical cyclone, remnant low, tropical disturbance, or monsoon depression

On 3 October, a broad low-pressure area had formed along a stationary front about 740 km (460 mi) west of the Azores. The low meandered over the north Atlantic for days. On 6 October, a large wind field had formed associated with the low. The low only developed shallow, weak convection, along with a long, curved cloud band, and a cold-core center—typical characteristics of an extratropical low. The system began to acquire subtropical characteristics on the next day, benefits from warm sea surface temperature of 27 °C (81 °F), thus the National Hurricane Center (NHC) noted for a high chance of tropical cyclogenesis. Although the system lost some of its organization due to dry mid-level air, it managed to develop gale-force winds and a well-defined center. Deep convection continued to develop near the center early on 9 October, and the NHC classified the system as Tropical Storm Ophelia at 06:00 UTC, about 1,410 km (875 mi) west-southwest of the Azores.

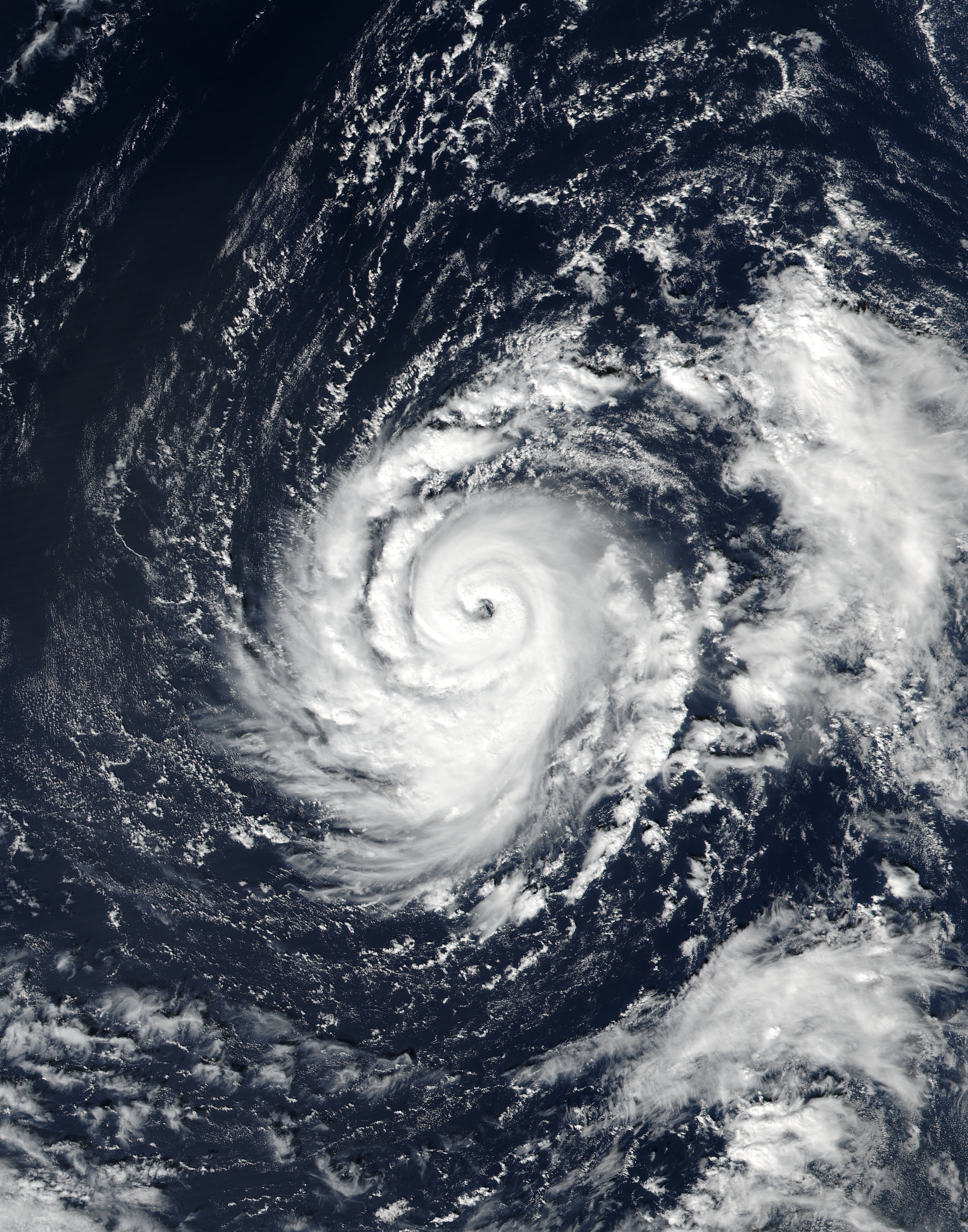
Hurricane Ophelia near its initial peak intensity on 12 October

Despite moving over marginally warm waters of 26.5 °C (79.7 °F), the effects of cold air temperatures aloft and decreasing wind shear allowed Ophelia to gradually strengthen. At the same time, Ophelia drifted several hundred miles southwest of the Azores due to the cut off from mid-latitude westerlies. In addition, the large temperature contrast between the unusually-warm ocean surface and the extremely cold temperatures in the upper atmosphere provided instability for Ophelia's thunderstorms, which allowed the storm to continue strengthening, despite marginally warm ocean temperatures. Late on 10 October, Ophelia began to move southeastwards as it embedded in a mid-to upper-level trough. A slight degradation of the structure of the storm resulted in some weakening early on 11 October, but this was short-lived as deep convection wrapped around the entire storm. After developing a ragged eye, the NHC upgraded Ophelia to a hurricane at 18:00 UTC about 1,225 km (760 mi) south of the Azores. Upon the upgrade, Ophelia becoming the record-tying tenth consecutive hurricane to form during the 2017 hurricane season; this was the fourth such occurrence after 1878, 1886, and 1893 seasons. (Note: 1878, 1886, and 1893 also had ten consecutive hurricanes form; however as these years are several decades before the advent of satellite data (post-1966), these years may be considered unreliable as several tropical storms in between could have been easily missed. Conversely, before the satellite era, hurricanes might have not been detected or detected but not as hurricanes, so there could be other seasons before the satellite era that had 10 or more consecutive hurricanes.) Afterwards, Ophelia steadily intensified as it became nearly stationary, intensifying to a Category 2 hurricane late on 12 October, as the eye became better defined. Ophelia achieved its initial peak intensity at 06:00 UTC on 13 October, with maximum sustained winds of 169 km/h (105 mph) and a central pressure of 966 mbar (966 hPa; 28.5 inHg).

The hurricane accelerated to the northeast, under the influence of the large mid-latitude trough. Ophelia weakened slightly later that day. The cloud tops warmed due to moderate vertical wind shear, but wind shear decreased shortly afterwards, allowed Ophelia to strengthen once again. Its eye became better defined, and the NHC upgraded Ophelia to a Category 3 hurricane at 12:00 UTC on 14 October; at 27.7°W, this was the farthest east that a storm of such intensity had been observed in the satellite era. It attained its peak intensity simultaneously with maximum sustained winds of 185 km/h (115 mph) and a central pressure of 959 mbar (959 hPa; 28.3 inHg) while located approximately 925 km (575 mi) southwest of the Azores. Early on 15 October, increasing wind shear and cold waters of 20 °C (68 °F) caused Ophelia to gradually weaken. Embedded within a fast southwesterly flow, Ophelia raced to the north-northeast with a speed of 61 km/h (38 mph). After losing all of its deep convection and becoming attached to a warm front and a cold front, the storm became extratropical at 00:00 UTC on the next day, about 500 km (310 mi) southwest of Mizen Head. The extratropical low then made landfall in southwestern Ireland, near Valentia Island, with winds of 121 km/h (75 mph), at 11:00 UTC. Afterwards, Ophelia's extratropical remnants tracked over Ireland and made its second landfall in Soay, Inner Hebrides with winds of 97 km/h (60 mph), at 23:45 UTC. On 17 October, the extratropical low turned to the east-northeast, and tracked over the North Sea. The storm made its third and final landfall in Våge, Austevoll, with winds of 72 km/h (45 mph), at 17:30 UTC, before dissipating over Norway early on 18 October.

== Preparations and impact ==
The precursor to Ophelia just before formation on 8 October

=== Azores ===
The Portuguese Institute of the Sea and the Atmosphere issued a red warning for heavy rainfall for the eastern group of the Azores—São Miguel, Santa Maria and Formigas—on 14 October from 17:59 UTC to 23:59 UTC. An orange gale warning was issued for the eastern group for the afternoon through night of 14–15 October, as well as a yellow alert for high seas. Rainfall alerts were also issued for the central group—Terceira, Graciosa, São Jorge Island, Pico and Faial.

The President of the Regional Service of Civil Protection of the Azores, Lieutenant-Colonel Carlos Neves, announced there was no serious damage. High winds downed four trees on São Miguel, three in the Ponta Delgada district and one in Povoação. The island also experienced some minor flooding. In the central group of the Azores, there were a few instances of light damage, with one home suffering a roof leak.

=== Iberia ===
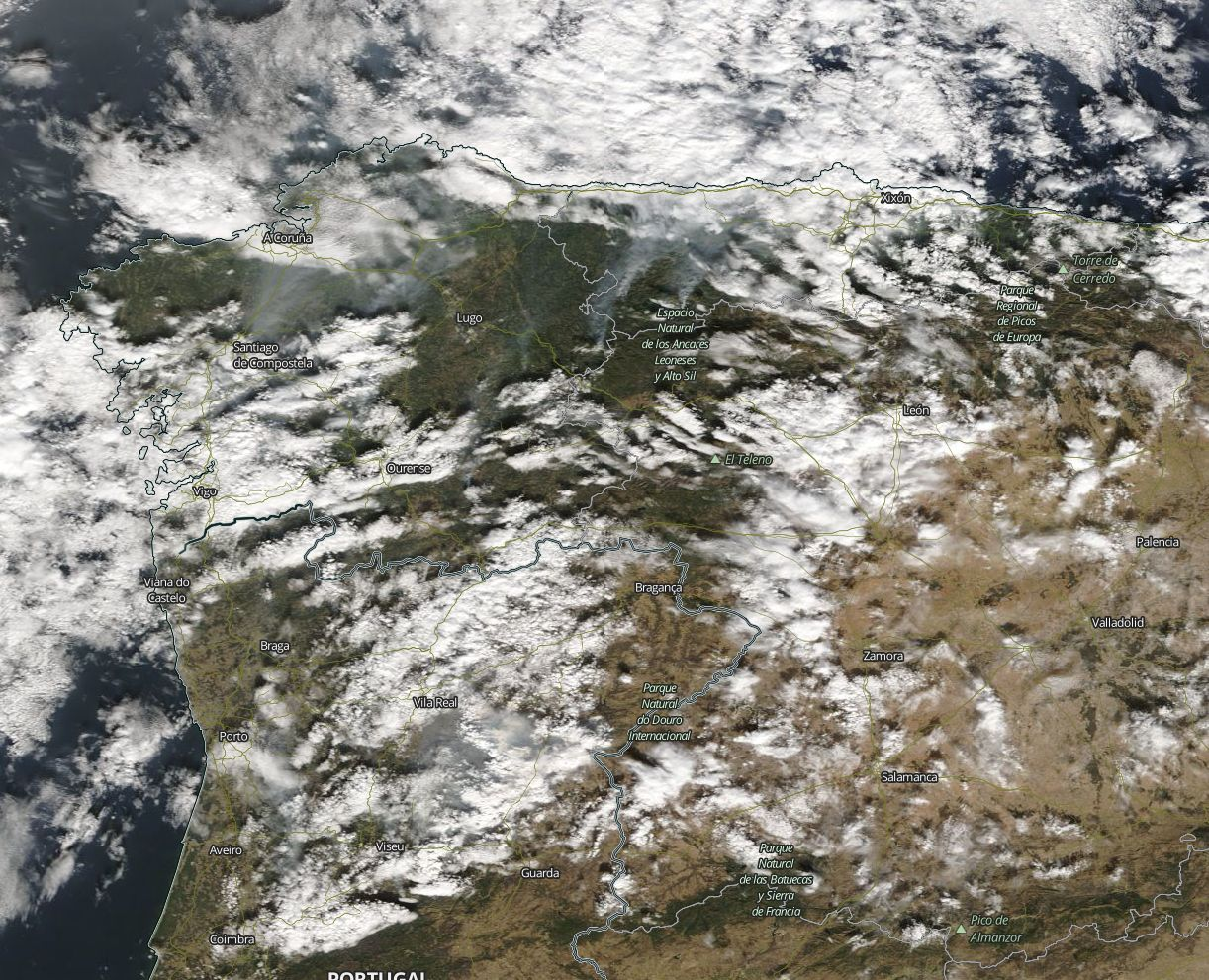
Satellite image depicting smoke from wildfires in northern Portugal and northwestern Spain on 15 October, ahead of Hurricane Ophelia

Starting on 15 October 2017, winds from Ophelia fanned wildfires in both Portugal and Spain. The wildfires have claimed the lives of at least 49 individuals, including 45 in Portugal and four in Spain, and dozens more were injured. In Portugal, more than 4,000 firefighters battled around 150 fires. The National Hurricane Center's Tropical Cyclone Report on Hurricane Ophelia makes no mention of the fires, thus the associated fatalities are not included as part of the storm total.

=== Ireland ===
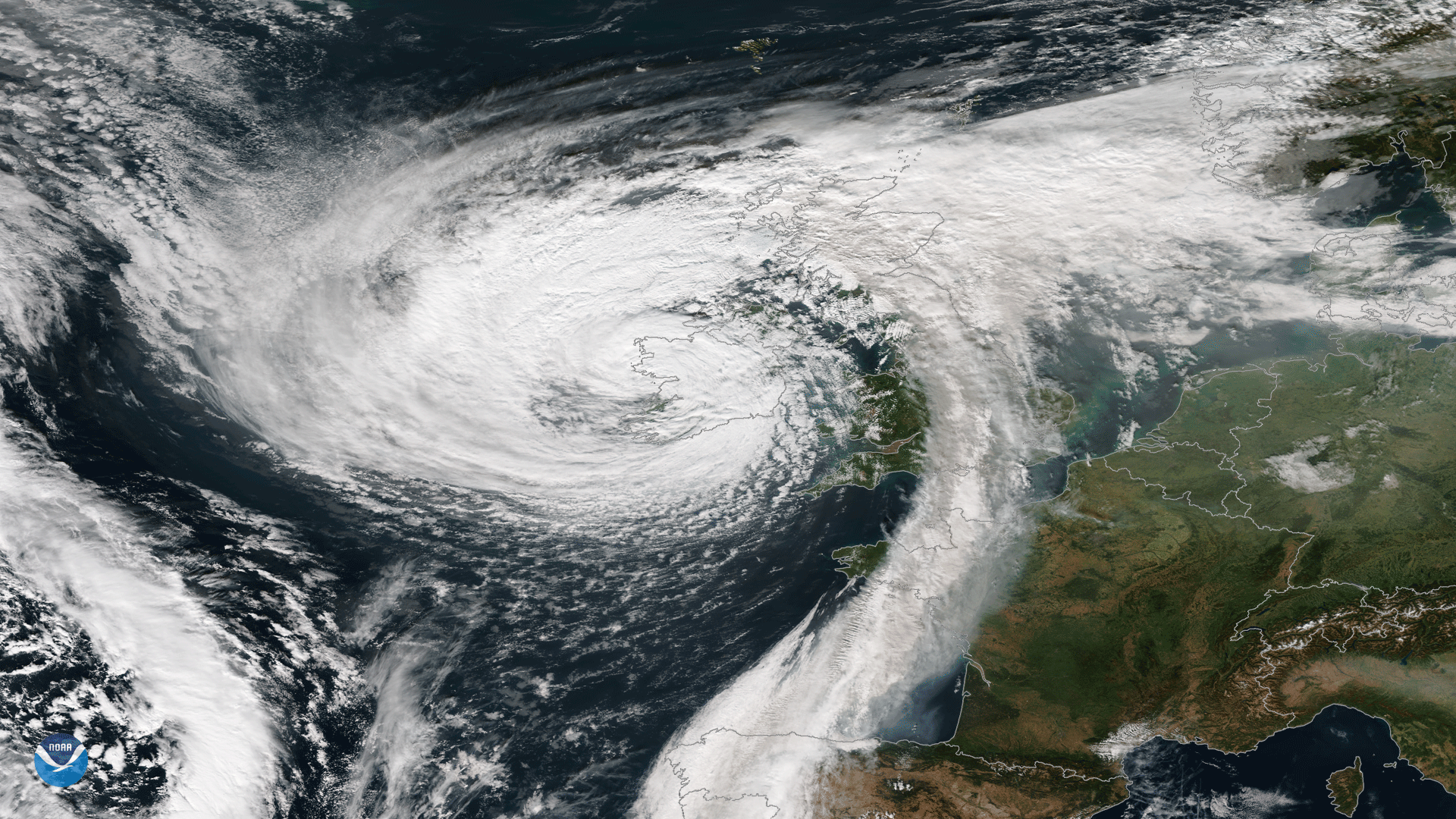
Ophelia making landfall in Ireland as an extratropical cyclone on 16 October

Met Éireann, Ireland's national meteorological service, reported on 12 October that the storm would reach Ireland. On 14 October, it issued a 'Status Red' warning, its highest storm category, for portions of Ireland. Issuing such a warning more than 48 hours in advance was "unprecedented," as such warnings are normally issued within 24 hours of the event. On 15 October, the National Emergency Coordination Centre and Met Éireann convened to advise the public in relation to the post-tropical storm reaching Ireland. At 20:15 on the 15th, 'status red' was extended to all of Ireland, and all public education services were confirmed as cancelled.

The Department of Education confirmed that all Montessoris, crèches, primary and post-primary schools would be closed on 16 and 17 October. Other public services would be withdrawn such as Court and District Court services, third-level institutes such as UCC, CIT, University of Limerick, and Waterford Institute of Technology. Aer Lingus confirmed a number of flights from Cork Airport and Shannon Airport would be cancelled, with the likelihood of 50 flights being cancelled. All public transport previously scheduled within the red alert zone were cancelled including bus, rail and ferry journeys. Bus Éireann announced the cancellation of school bus services for the west of Ireland after Met Éireann issued a rare Status Red warning affecting the south western and western counties of Wexford, Waterford, Cork, Kerry, Clare, Mayo and Galway. The Department of Housing, Planning and Local Government confirmed members of the public should not make any unnecessary journeys especially travelling within the red level warning areas and the department reiterated the storm's potential risk to life.

On 16 October, gusts of up to 191 km/h (119 mph) were recorded at Fastnet Rock off the coast of County Cork, the highest wind speeds ever recorded in Ireland. 10-minute sustained wind speeds at Roches Point, also in County Cork, reached 111 km/h (69 mph), with gusts of 156 km/h (97 mph).

ESB Group confirmed that more than 360,000 customers were without power in the wake of the storm. Two people, a man in Dundalk and a woman in Aglish, County Waterford, were killed when trees fell on their cars. In County Tipperary, another fatality occurred when a man was clearing a fallen tree with a chainsaw. Two men died in separate incidents after suffering fatal injuries while carrying out repairs to damage caused by Ophelia and Storm Brian. In Cork, a man died after he fell while working on a shed roof, and in County Wicklow another man died after falling from a ladder while carrying out repairs to his farm shed. Initially, it was estimated that Ophelia would cause €1.5 billion (US$1.8 billion) worth of losses in Ireland, mostly due to the shutdown of economic activities on the day of its passage. However, as of 24 October, insurance claims across the country just reached €50 million (US$59 million), much less than the initial estimation of damage. Total damage across the country stood at €68.7 million (US$81.1 million).

=== United Kingdom ===
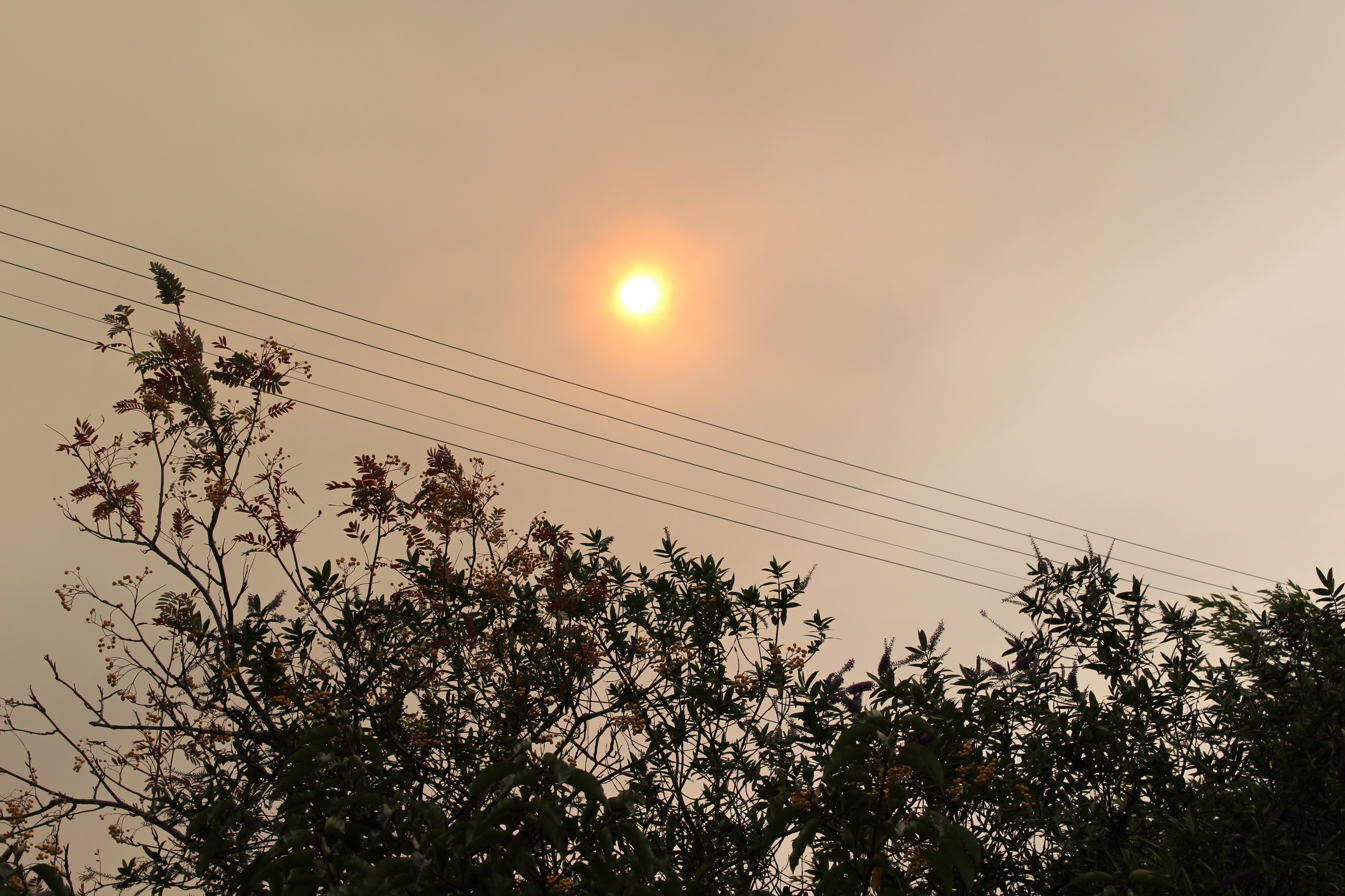
Saharan dust and smoke brought north by the former hurricane created hazy skies across parts of the United Kingdom on 16 October, resulting in an orange sky and orange or red sun.

The Met Office in the United Kingdom issued the first severe weather warnings for Ophelia on 12 October, referring to the hurricane as "ex-Ophelia" in the context of the 2017–18 UK and Ireland windstorm season. The severe weather warning initially issued on 12 October was a yellow weather warning for wind, covering Northern Ireland, western England, Wales, and southern and western Scotland, valid between 12:00 and 23:55 BST on 15 October. The weather warning impact matrix warned of relatively severe impacts anticipated, although with a low level of certainty so far in advance preventing the issuance of amber weather warnings initially. Subsequently, on 13 October, a yellow severe weather warning for wind was issued for Northern Ireland, southern Scotland, western England and Wales, valid between 00:05 and 15:00 BST on 17 October. The weather warning for wind in Northern Ireland on 15 October was upgraded to an amber.

The arrival of Ophelia brought Saharan dust to parts of the United Kingdom, giving the sky an orange or yellow-sepia appearance, and the sun a red or orange appearance. A strange 'burning' smell was also reported across Devon, also attributed to the dust, and smoke from forest fires in Portugal and Spain. Winds up to 115 km/h (71 mph) were observed in Orlock Head, County Down, at the height of the storm. Approximately 50,000 households lost power in Northern Ireland. Insurance claims from Northern Ireland, Wales, and Scotland are estimated to reach £5–10 million (US$6.6–13.3 million).

=== Estonia ===
In Tallinn, Estonia, black rain fell because Ophelia brought smoke and the soot of fires to Estonia from Portugal, as well as dust from the Sahara Desert, Report informs citing the Estonian media. "We looked at photos from satellites and the Finnish weather service confirmed that the smoke and soot of the fires in Portugal and partly the dust from the Sahara reached us," meteorologist Taimi Paljak said.

== Relation to climate change ==
Climate scientist Reindert Haarsma of the Royal Netherlands Meteorological Institute said that climate change is likely to cause Europe to see more hurricanes like Ophelia, as the oceans get warmer, although they were still comparing their model's results (previously reported in 2013) with those from other climate centres. But UCD Professors Ray Bates and Ray McGrath argued that "insofar as the influence of the sea surface temperature is concerned, the exceptional strength of Storm Ophelia was due to natural variability" rather than global warming.

== See also ==
- Weather of 2017
- Tropical cyclones in 2017
- Other tropical cyclones named Ophelia
- List of Azores hurricanes
- Tropical cyclone effects in Europe – Other former tropical storms that have affected Europe in the past
- Hurricane Debbie (1961) – caused severe impacts in Europe as a powerful extratropical cyclone
- Great Storm of 1987 – a deadly and destructive extratropical cyclone that impacted the United Kingdom exactly 30 years beforehand.
- Hurricane Lili (1996) – hurricane which struck the United Kingdom and Ireland as an extratropical storm, causing over £150,000,000 of damage and resulted in the loss of six lives in the UK.
- Hurricane Vince (2005) – easternmost Atlantic hurricane on record that made an extremely rare landfall on the Iberian Peninsula as a tropical depression
- Tropical Storm Grace (2009) – is considered the north-easternmost tropical cyclone to form in the North Atlantic basin.
- Cyclone Tini (2014) – Also known as Storm Darwin, a previous strong windstorm which affected Ireland.
- Hurricane Leslie (2018) – A long-lived hurricane that also impacted the Iberian Peninsula
- Hurricane Lorenzo (2019) – another rare East Atlantic major hurricane that likewise affected the Azores and the British Isles
- Hurricane Pablo (2019) – Another system that attained hurricane status in the northeastern Atlantic.
