= Hurricane Tanya =

Category 1 Atlantic hurricane in 1995

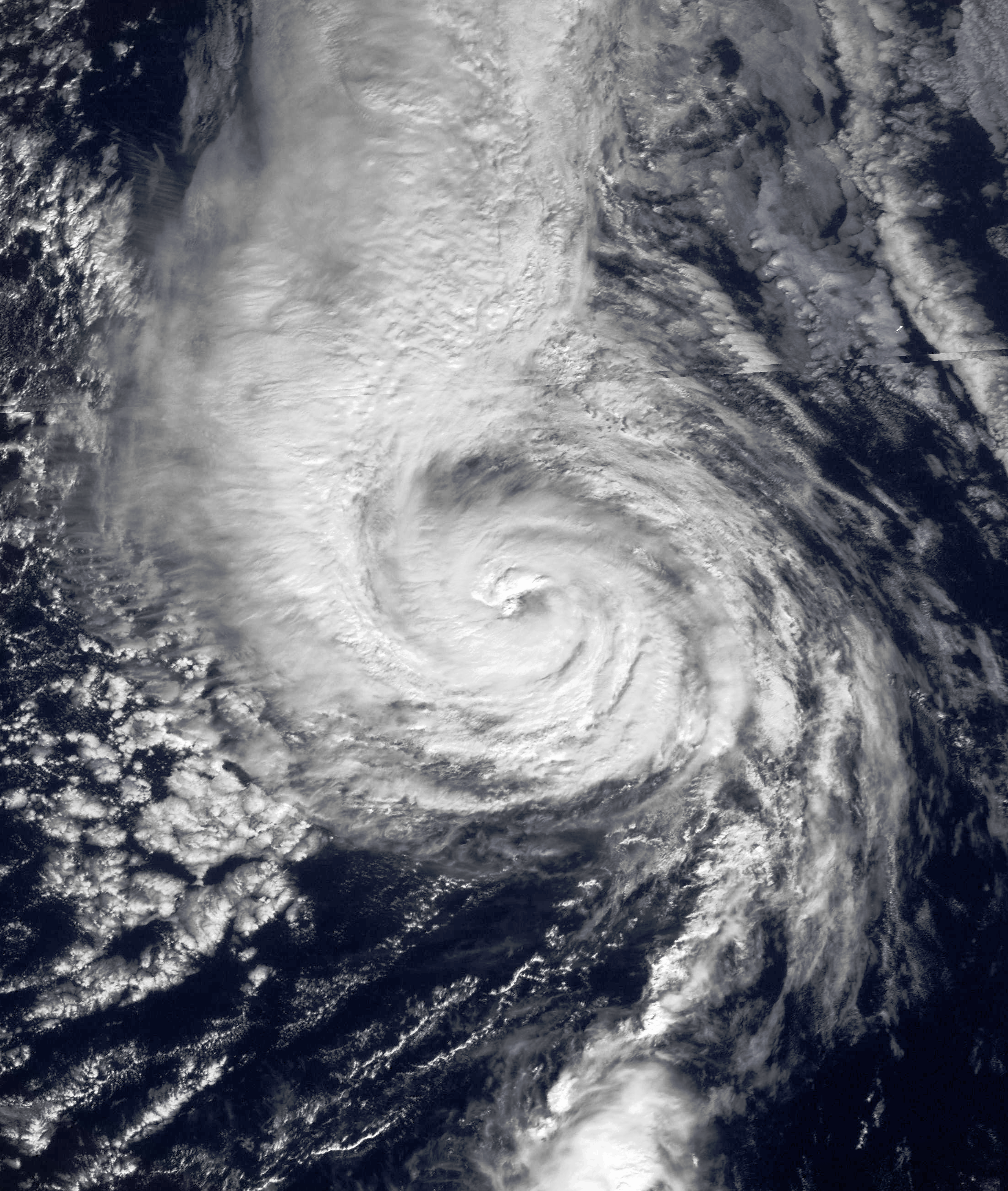
- Hurricane Tanya near peak intensity in the Atlantic on October 31, 1995

Meteorological history
- Formed: October 27, 1995
- Extratropical: November 1, 1995
- Dissipated: November 3, 1995

Category 1 hurricane
- 1-minute sustained (SSHWS/NWS)
- Highest winds: 85 mph (140 km/h)
- Lowest pressure: 972 mbar (hPa); 28.70 inHg

Overall effects
- Fatalities: 1 direct
- Damage: Minimal
- Areas affected: Azores
- IBTrACS
- Part of the 1995 Atlantic hurricane season

Hurricane Tanya was a moderate Category 1 hurricane which became the first named storm to start with a "T" in the Atlantic since naming began in 1950, and the final storm of the very active 1995 Atlantic hurricane season. The twenty-first tropical cyclone, nineteenth named storm, and eleventh hurricane of the season, Tanya developed from a tropical wave while well north of the Lesser Antilles on October 26. The system headed northeastward and strengthened into Tropical Storm Tanya on October 27. Tanya meandered around the central Atlantic, and further intensified into a hurricane on October 29. Thereafter, Tanya tracked northeastward before curving to the east-northeast. After switching to an eastward direction, Tanya weakened to a tropical storm on November 1. Later that day, Tanya passed through the Azores as it was transitioning into an extratropical cyclone.

Throughout the Azores, the extratropical remnants of Tanya produced high winds. As a result, extensive property damage occurred, which included destroyed or damaged houses, and sunken boats; there were also reports of significant damage to agriculture. However, an exact damage toll figure is unknown. In addition, there was one fatality and several injuries.

== Meteorological history ==
Map plotting the storm's track and intensity, according to the Saffir–Simpson scale Map key Saffir–Simpson scale Tropical depression (≤38 mph, ≤62 km/h) Tropical storm (39–73 mph, 63–118 km/h) Category 1 (74–95 mph, 119–153 km/h) Category 2 (96–110 mph, 154–177 km/h) Category 3 (111–129 mph, 178–208 km/h) Category 4 (130–156 mph, 209–251 km/h) Category 5 (≥157 mph, ≥252 km/h) Unknown Storm type Tropical cyclone Subtropical cyclone Extratropical cyclone, remnant low, tropical disturbance, or monsoon depression

The origins of Hurricane Tanya were from a tropical wave that moved off the western coast of Africa in the middle of October. The wave closely followed the path of Tropical Storm Sebastien and was unable to develop in the tropical Atlantic as it moved westward. The system did not begin to become organized until October 25 while south-southeast of Bermuda. However, the Dvorak technique was still unable to classify the system until October 26 as the low-cloud swirl became better organized while moving northward in the central Atlantic. That evening, a closed circulation had formed, and it was classified as Tropical Depression Twenty-One by the National Hurricane Center. On the morning of October 27, it strengthened into a tropical storm, becoming the 19th as well as the final named storm of the season. Operationally, it was not declared a tropical cyclone until that point, when it was immediately declared Tropical Storm Tanya.

Immediately after becoming a tropical storm, the movement of Tanya became hindered by a nearby upper-level low, and it quickly turned eastward before virtually stalling early on October 28. The upper-level low also influenced Tanya in giving it some subtropical characteristics, including a comma-shaped cloud band and maximum winds far from the center of the storm at the time. Despite that, the storm gradually strengthened as it remained over warm waters of about 81 °F (27 °C). That afternoon, it gained full tropical characteristics, as an eye featured was beginning to form in the central dense overcast. The eye became clearly defined, although it was small in size. Early on October 29, Tropical Storm Tanya was upgraded to a hurricane, the eleventh of the 1995 season, as it turned northward in response to the nearby low.

Later on October 29, while slowly tracking north, Tanya leveled off as a low-end Category 1 hurricane. By the next morning, a cold front to the west forced Tanya to accelerate in a more easterly track . It remained fairly well organized with a distinct eye as it became wedged in a narrow zone of warm air between the cold front to the west and the upper-level low to the northeast. Despite slightly cooler water, Tanya strengthened a bit more that afternoon, reaching its peak intensity of 85 mph (135 km/h) with a barometric pressure of 972 mbar (28.7 inHg) as the forward speed increased. That intensity was maintained until late on October 31, when Tanya began to weaken as it traveled over cooler waters and the eye became obscured. Early on November 1, Tanya began to lose tropical characteristics while still a hurricane. Hurricane Tanya was also heading rapidly northeast towards the Azores at the time. Tanya was downgraded from a hurricane to a tropical storm on November 1. Despite weakening, the wind field of Tanya became larger. That evening, Tanya was declared fully extratropical as it passed the Azores. The remnant cyclone turned north, before being absorbed by another extratropical cyclone early on November 3.

== Impact, naming and records ==
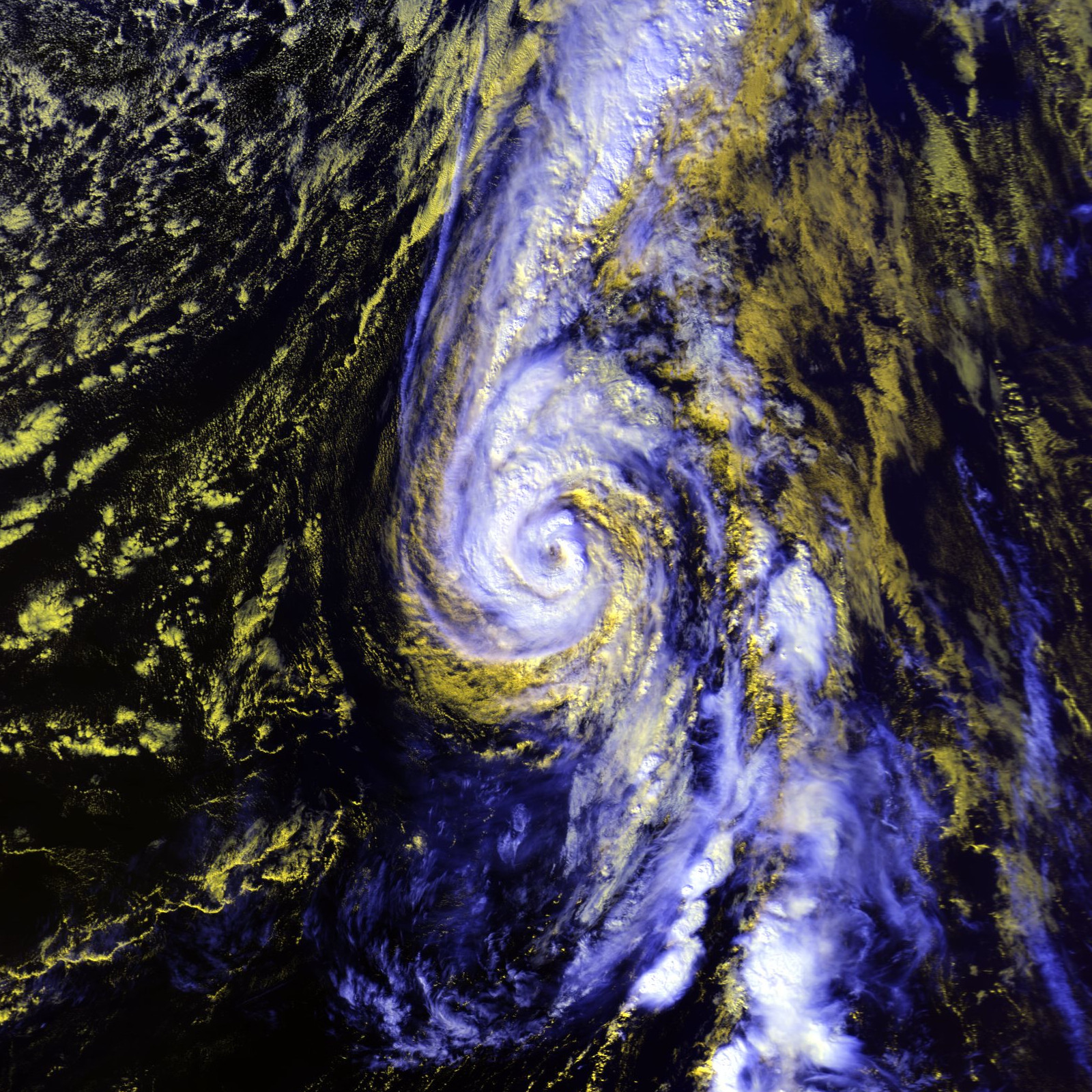
Hurricane Tanya intensifying over the northern Atlantic on October 30

Hurricane Tanya was not considered a threat to land, as it did not move through the Azores while a tropical cyclone. The Azores were hit very hard by the storm, which had just been declared extratropical when it hit the region. Damage was particularly severe on the islands of Faial, Pico, Terceira and São Jorge. Extensive property damage was reported, including many capsized boats and several damaged or destroyed homes. Significant agricultural damage also occurred there. Many trees and power lines were knocked down, cutting electricity and hampering communications in the area. The highest wind gusts reported in the Azores were around 105 mph (170 km/h). After the storm, a resolution was submitted to the European Parliament by the Government of Portugal and a disaster area was declared in the islands. One Spanish fisherman drowned and several people were injured.

There were many reports of tropical storm-force winds from ships in the north Atlantic. One ship, with the call sign GBSA, encountered Tanya's winds twice and reported the strongest winds from any ship, 71 mph (112 km/h).

Hurricane Tanya was the first tropical cyclone to be designated a name starting with the letter "T" since naming of Atlantic tropical cyclones began in 1950. There have been six subsequent T-named Atlantic tropical storms: Tammy in 2005 and 2023, Tomas in 2010, Tony in 2012, Teddy in 2020, and Teresa in 2021. Additionally, the name Theta was used in 2020, although that was a Greek letter.

== See also ==
- Other storms of the same name
- List of Azores hurricanes
