= List of storms named Tanya =

The name Tanya has been used for three tropical cyclones worldwide.

In the Atlantic Ocean:

- Hurricane Tanya (1995), Category 1 hurricane that meandered around the central Atlantic

In the Australian Region:

- Cyclone Tanya (1985), made landfall in Queensland and then in the Northern Territory

In the Western Pacific Ocean:

- Typhoon Tanya (1999) (T9919, 17W), never threatened land.
