= Hurricane Pablo =

Category 1 Atlantic hurricane in 2019

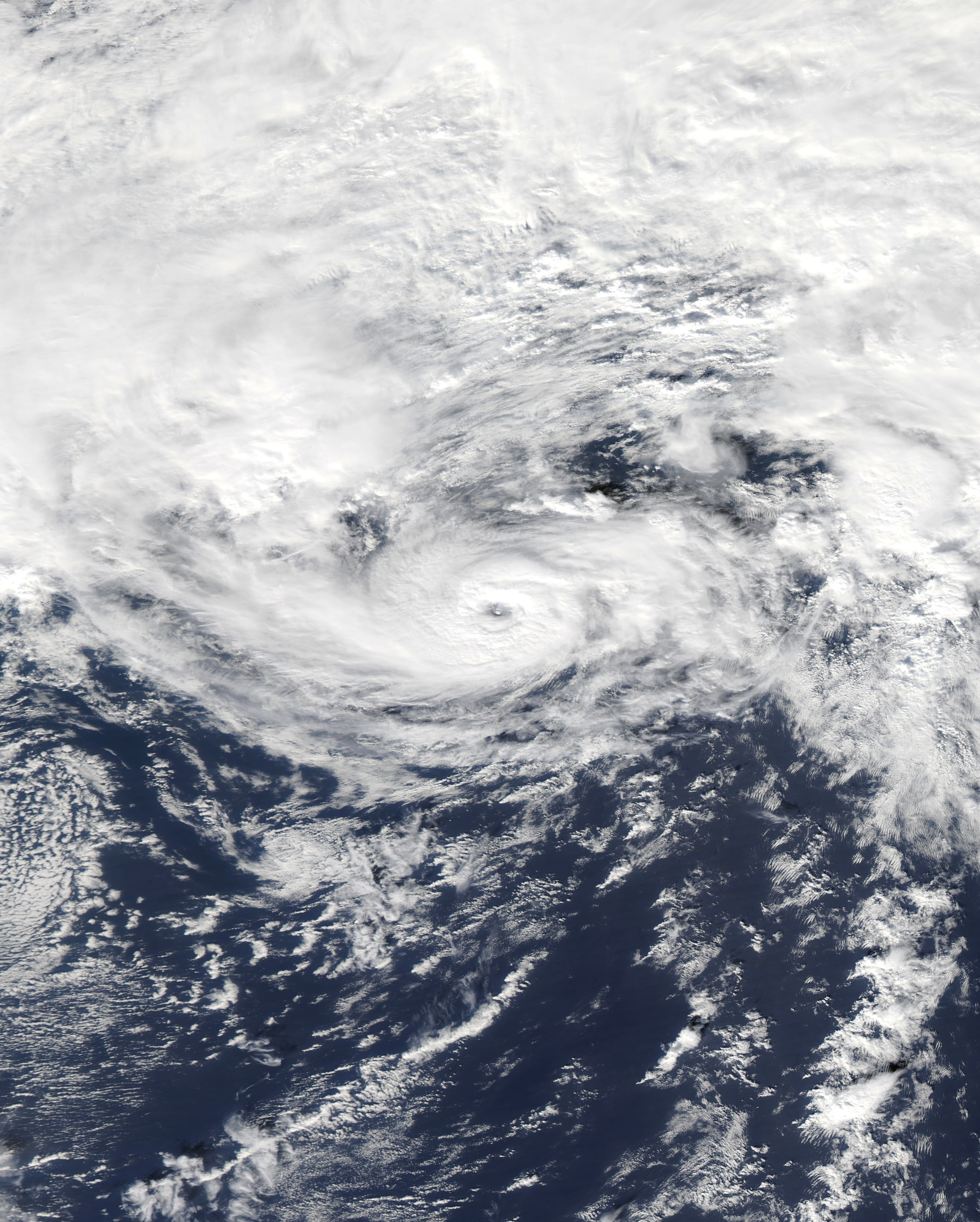
- Satellite image of Hurricane Pablo near peak intensity on October 27

Meteorological history
- Formed: October 25, 2019
- Post-tropical: October 28, 2019
- Dissipated: October 29, 2019

Category 1 hurricane
- 1-minute sustained (SSHWS/NWS)
- Highest winds: 80 mph (130 km/h)
- Lowest pressure: 977 mbar (hPa); 28.85 inHg

Overall effects
- Fatalities: None reported
- Damage: Minimal
- Areas affected: United Kingdom, Portugal (Azores, Madeira), France
- IBTrACS
- Part of the 2019 Atlantic hurricane season

Hurricane Pablo was a late-season tropical cyclone that became the farthest east-forming hurricane in the North Atlantic tropical cyclone basin on record, beating the previous record set by Hurricane Vince in 2005. The seventeenth tropical/subtropical cyclone, sixteenth named storm and sixth hurricane of the 2019 Atlantic hurricane season, Pablo originated from a baroclinic cyclone a few hundred miles west of the Azores Islands. The precursor cyclone formed on October 22, traveling eastward towards the island chain. The system initially had multiple centers of circulation, but they consolidated into one small low-pressure system embedded within the larger extratropical storm. On October 25, the embedded cyclone developed into a subtropical cyclone, receiving the name Pablo. The cyclone continued eastwards, transitioning into a fully tropical storm later that day. Pablo quickly intensified between October 26 and 27, forming an eye and spiral rainbands. At 12:00 Coordinated Universal Time (UTC) on October 27, Pablo intensified into a Category 1 hurricane. The storm continued to strengthen, reaching its peak intensity of 80 mph (130 km/h) and a minimum central pressure of 977 mbar (28.9 inHg) at 18:00 UTC on the same day. The storm quickly weakened the next day, becoming extratropical again, and dissipated on October 29.

Pablo and its parent low-pressure system brought gale- and storm-force winds to portions of the Azores. A total of 12 landslides were reported in the island chain. Regional weather centers issued a yellow alert for several islands. A traffic incident in Sao Miguel injured three people. In the British Isles, Pablo's remnants merged with another extratropical cyclone, which caused heavy rain and wind gusts over 80 mph (130 km/h). Overall damage was minimal, and no deaths were reported.

== Meteorological history ==
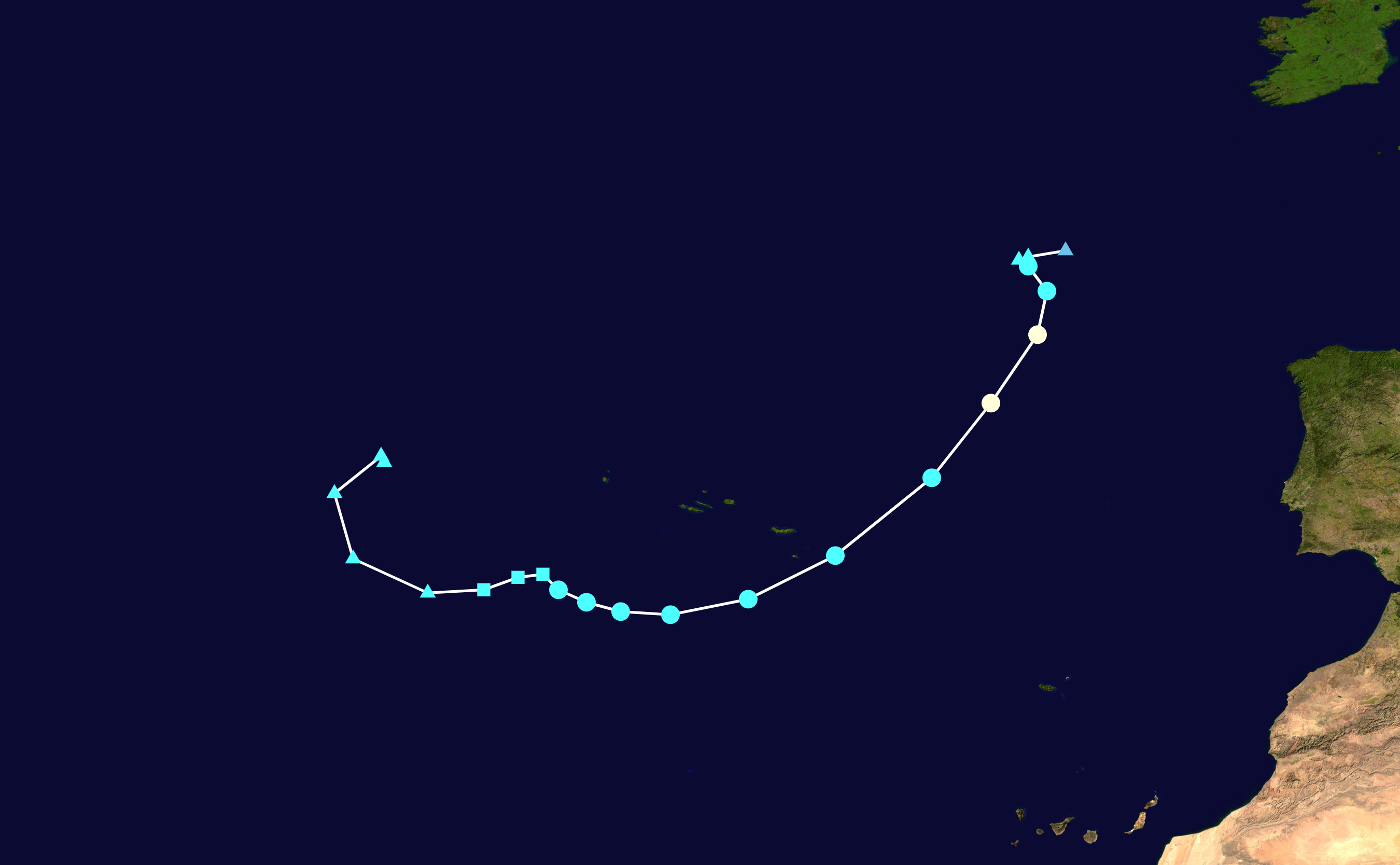
Map plotting the storm's track and intensity, according to the Saffir–Simpson scale Map key Saffir–Simpson scale Tropical depression (≤38 mph, ≤62 km/h) Tropical storm (39–73 mph, 63–118 km/h) Category 1 (74–95 mph, 119–153 km/h) Category 2 (96–110 mph, 154–177 km/h) Category 3 (111–129 mph, 178–208 km/h) Category 4 (130–156 mph, 209–251 km/h) Category 5 (≥157 mph, ≥252 km/h) Unknown Storm type Tropical cyclone Subtropical cyclone Extratropical cyclone, remnant low, tropical disturbance, or monsoon depression

The origins of Pablo can be traced to a baroclinic cyclone that developed on October 22. The system developed gale-force winds soon after formation, and multiple centers of vorticity formed on the next day. The easternmost vorticity center became dominant and developed a small radius of storm-force winds, which were winds greater than 55 mph (89 km/h). On October 23, clusters of convection, or showers and thunderstorms, materialized at the center of the cyclone. The small storm traveled southwestward, then southeastward, around the larger baroclinic low on October 24. Central convection associated with the storm increased, and at 00:00 Coordinated Universal Time (UTC) on October 25, the embedded low transitioned into a subtropical storm with winds of 50 mph (80 km/h). Operationally, it was believed that Pablo formed later at 21:00 UTC on the same day. Pablo moved generally northeastward on October 25, while convective activity continued to become better organized. ASCAT data showed that Pablo contained a well-defined circulation, and satellite imagery revealed that the storm developed a central dense overcast with occasional hints of an eye. Based on this information, the NHC determined that Pablo had transitioned into a fully tropical cyclone at 18:00 UTC on October 25.

Despite the increase in organization, data from a scatterometer showed that Pablo had weakened slightly down to 45 mph (72 km/h). The eye disappeared early on October 26, although convection persisted, due to an unstable environment. Later that day, the storm's eye became better-defined as it accelerated northeastward. The storm passed about 55 mi (89 km) south-southwest of Santa Maria Island in the Azores at 21:00 UTC on October 26, and made its closest pass to the archipelago around 00:00 UTC on October 27. Early on that day, an ASCAT pass showed that Pablo had intensified further to 65 mph (105 km/h), despite the storm's cloud pattern deteriorating slightly. A few hours later, the structure of the storm improved again, and the Pablo's eye was evident on infrared imagery. Satellite estimates based on the Dvorak technique were as high as 85 mph (137 km/h). At 12:00 UTC on October 27, the NHC upgraded Pablo to a Category 1 hurricane at 41.9°N 18.8°W, marking the easternmost intensification into a hurricane since reliable records began in 1950. Pablo defied predictions and continued to intensify, reaching its peak intensity of 80 mph (130 km/h) and a minimum central pressure of 977 mbar (28.9 inHg) at 18:00 UTC that same day. The NHC described Pablo's appearance as ""remarkably impressive", and a ring of −58 °F (−50 °C) cloud tops surrounded the distinct eye of the hurricane. The storm was still minuscule, with hurricane-force winds reaching outward only 10 mi (16 km) from the center. Soon after peak intensity, Pablo began weakening rapidly due to water temperatures of only 62.6 °F (17.0 °C). The storm also began to slow down and travel northward. The storm quickly approached the northeastern side of the parent baroclinic low, nearing a frontal area. The remaining convection was limited to the southeastern quadrant of the storm, and overall convective activity decreased significantly in depth. Pablo subsequently degenerated into a weak extratropical cyclone, after merging with the aforementioned front at 12:00 UTC on October 28. At this time, the storm consisted of low- and mid-level clouds with showers, with no convection left over the center. Pablo's center dissipated the next day, at 06:00 UTC. On October 30, the remnant front interacted with a stronger extratropical cyclone to the west, which would later become Windstorm Zed, named by the Free University of Berlin on the next day, on October 31. A new center of 1,010 mbar (30 inHg) formed west of Ireland on the same day. The remnants were absorbed by the eastward-moving Zed on November 1.

Structural evolution of Hurricane Pablo from a tropical disturbance into a hurricane
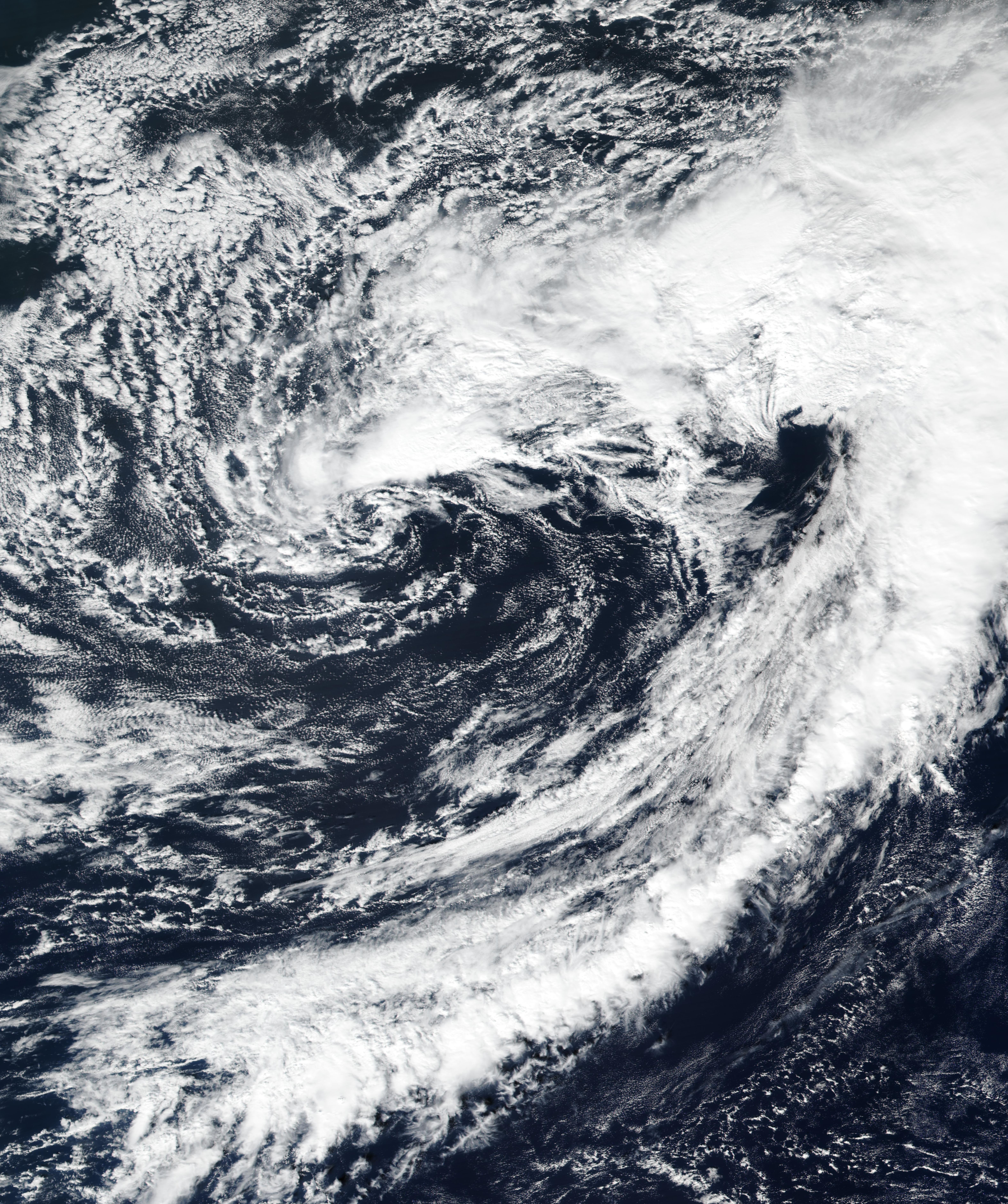
The precursor disturbance on October 23, 2019, while fully extratropical

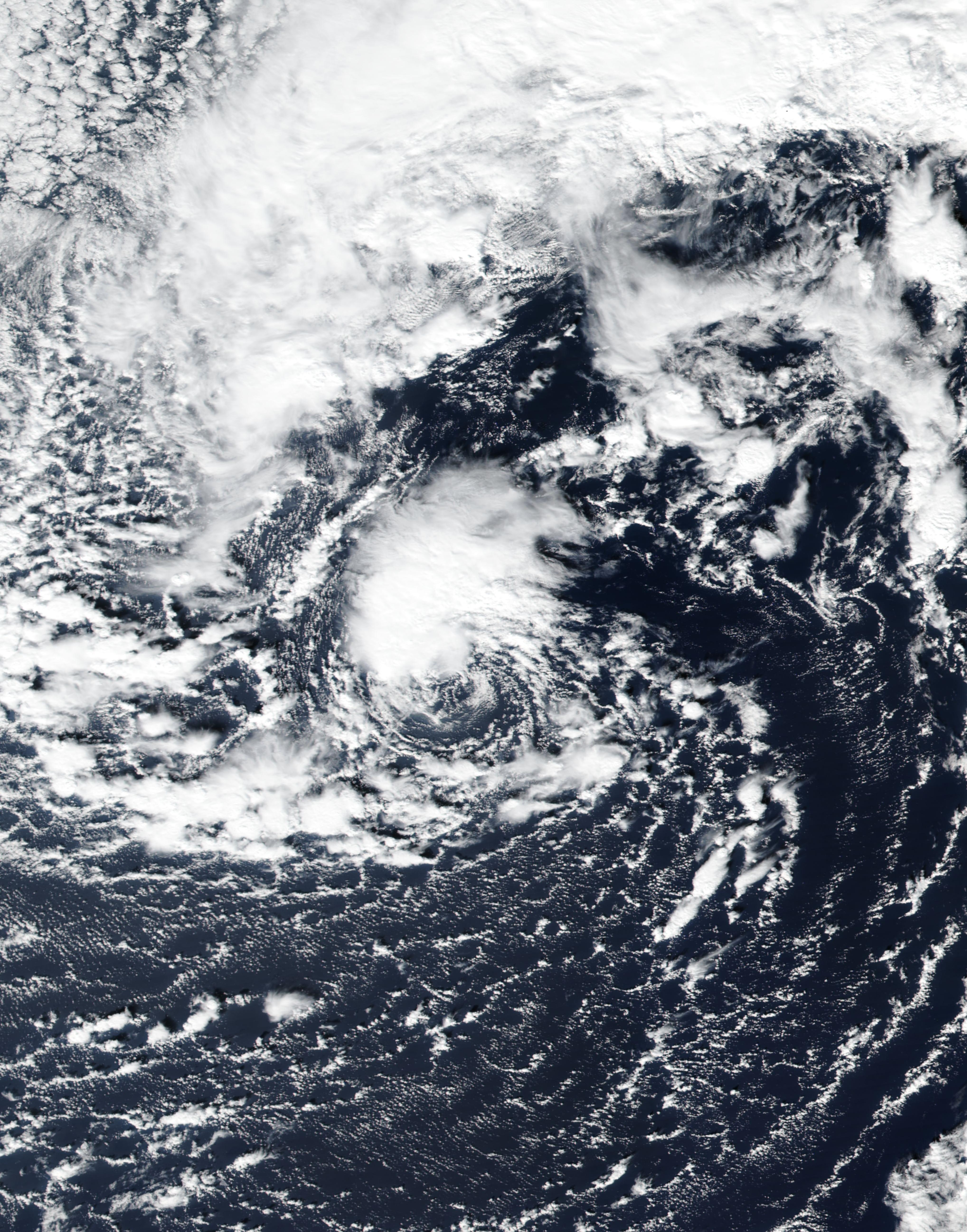
The low begins to gain subtropical characteristics on October 24, with convection increasing over a well-defined low-level circulation center

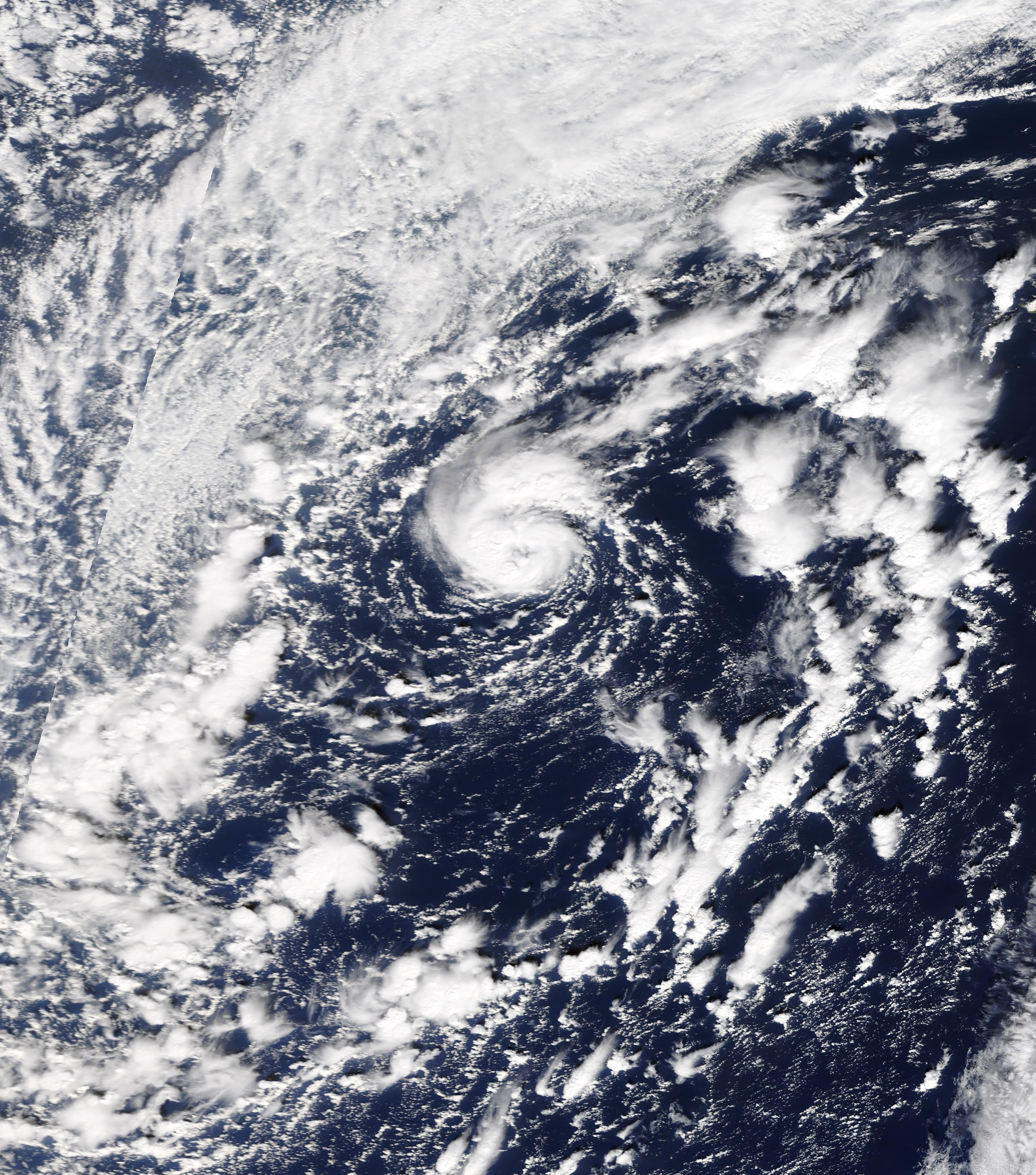
Convection concentrates around the center of circulation and Subtropical Storm Pablo forms. It is not fully tropical yet due to the lack of outflow and banding features.

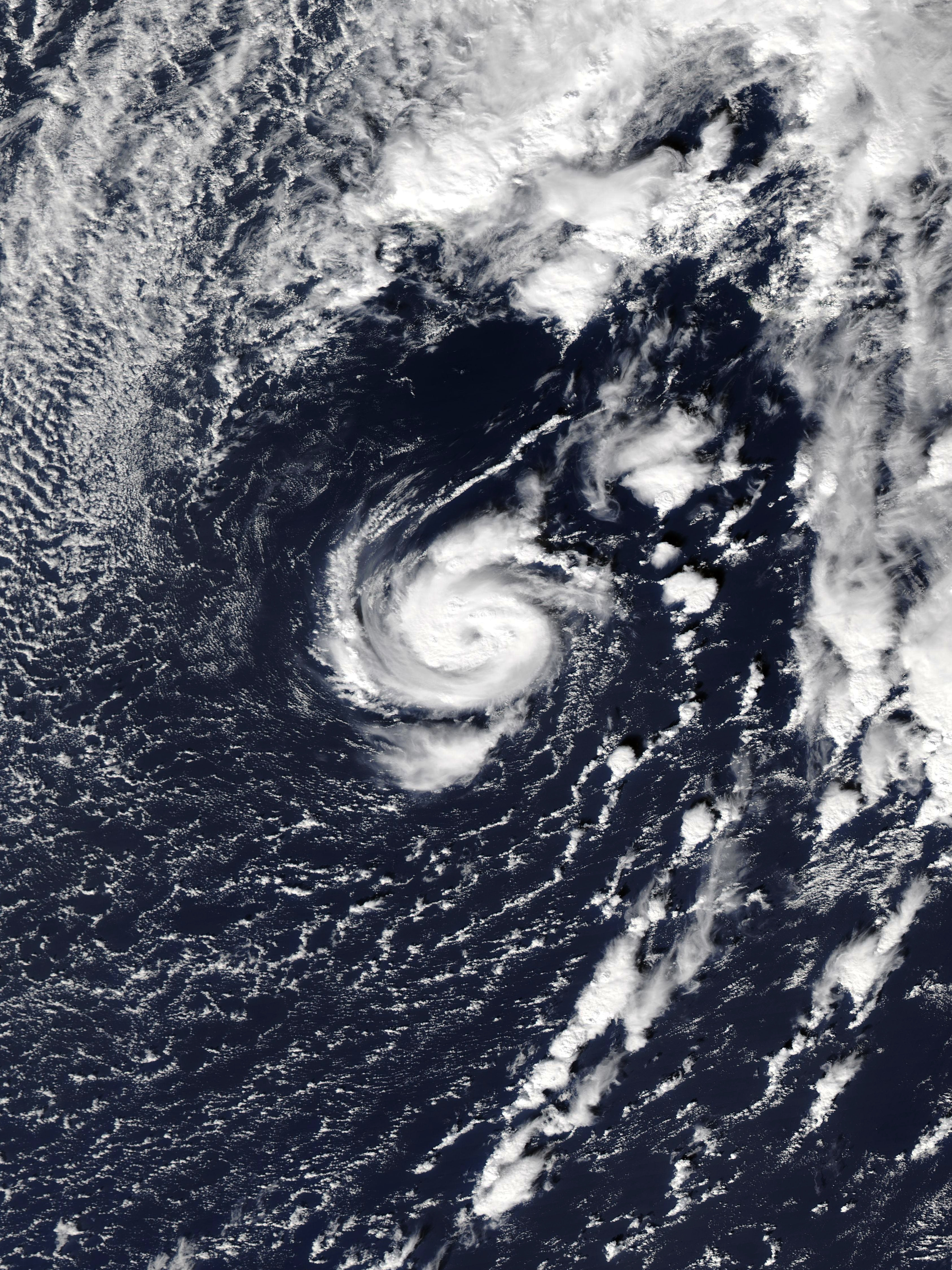
Banding features become increasingly defined, and an eye appears, signifying the storm's transition into a fully tropical storm.

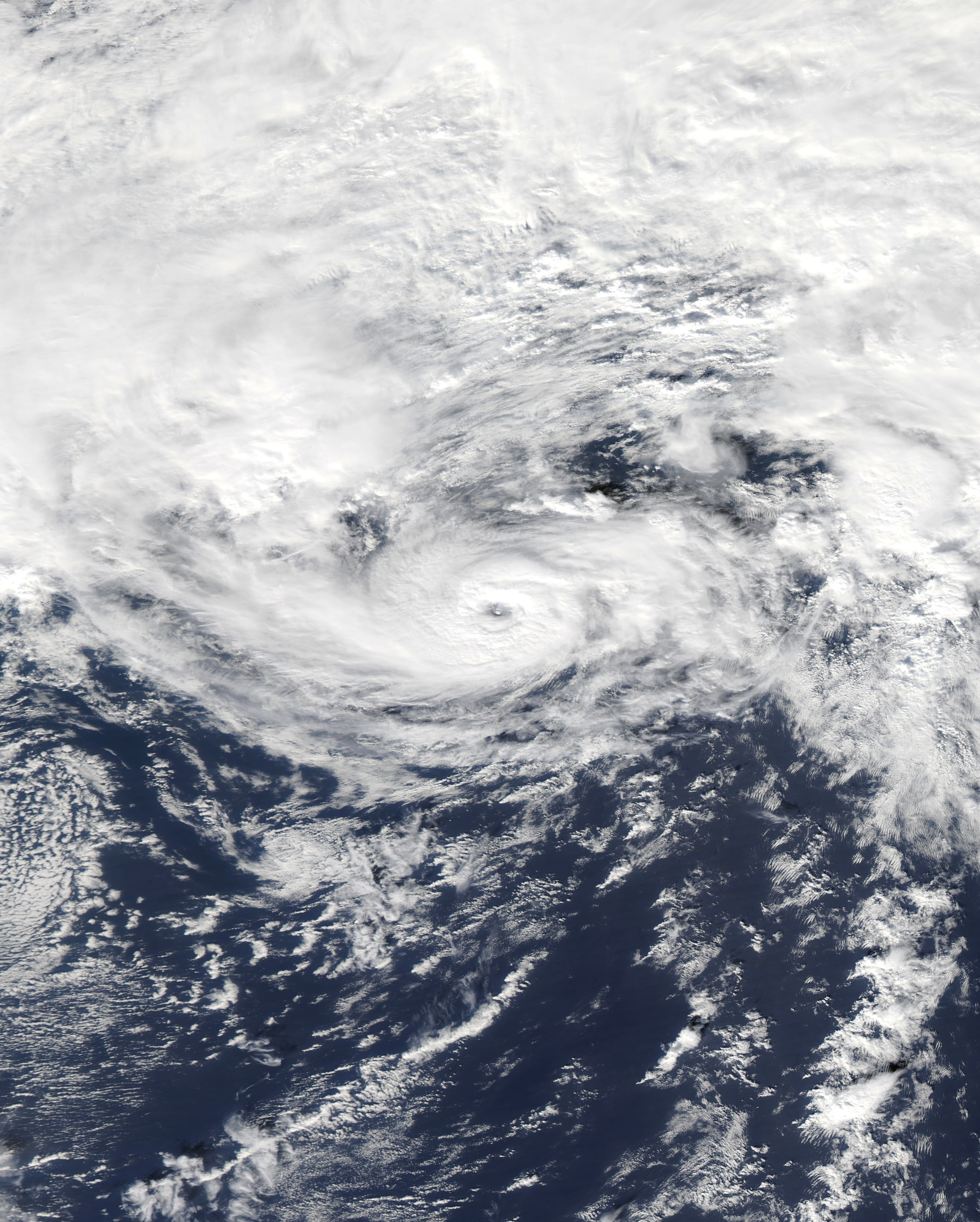
Pablo forms a clear eye with deep convection surrounding it on October 27, marking its intensification into a hurricane.

=== Background, forecasting and records ===
The previous record of the easternmost intensification into a hurricane was held by Hurricane Vince, forming at 34.1°N 18.9°W. Pablo formed only 0.1 degrees east of Vince's former record. In addition to becoming the farthest-east intensification into a hurricane, Pablo was also the second farthest-north intensification into a hurricane, after an unnamed hurricane in 1971, which developed at 46° North. According to Phil Klotzbach of Colorado State University, Pablo was also the strongest tropical cyclone that far north since 1894. Water temperatures under Pablo were only around 64 °F (18 °C) throughout its path, which was far lower than the average 79 °F (26 °C) needed for tropical cyclogenesis. This was also under the 72.5 °F (22.5 °C) required for subtropical development, according to a study by McTaggart-Cowan et al. (2015). Despite this, sea surface temperatures below Pablo were 1.8 °F (1.0 °C) higher than usual. Additionally, throughout the storm's life, very cold air high in the atmosphere increased instability, which allowed for convection to encircle Pablo's eye. Pablo's northeasterly forward motion concurred with southwesterly upper-level wind flow, minimizing the effects of wind shear on the system. The jet stream also provided good outflow for the storm.

Prior to post-analysis, Pablo was never designated as a subtropical storm, as the NHC had classified it as fully tropical by its first advisory. Additionally, Pablo was revealed to have formed 12 hours before Tropical Storm Olga. It was operationally believed that Olga formed at 15:00 UTC on October 25, six hours before Pablo. Thus, Pablo received the "P" name instead of the "O" name.

== Preparations and impact ==
Hurricane Pablo was poorly forecast, and developed into a subtropical cyclone before the NHC mentioned its possibility of tropical cyclogenesis in their Tropical Weather Outlook. Advisories were not issued on the storm until 21 hours after it formed. The Portuguese Institute for the Sea and Atmosphere (IMPA) warned of strong winds and high waves from Pablo and its parent extratropical cyclone. A yellow warning was issued. The United Nations' Global Disaster Alert and Coordination System (GDACS) issued a green alert for portions of the eastern Azores. Pablo and its parent low-pressure system caused gale-force and storm-force winds over the Azores Islands. GDACS estimated that 140,000 people were affected by tropical storm-force winds and storm surge of 0.66 ft (0.2 m). There were twelve reports of flooding and mudslides, with eight occurring on the island of Graciosa and four occurring on São Miguel Island. In the former, houses and businesses were flooded, and a structure collapsed. In the latter, two landslides occurred in the capital city of Ponta Delgada and two floods occurred elsewhere. A 29-year-old woman and two children were injured in a car accident on São Miguel. They were transported to the hospital. The Regional Service of Civil Protection and Firefighters of the Azores recorded no people displaced or dead.

The remnants of Pablo were absorbed by another extratropical cyclone, which in turn affected the British Isles. A Met Éireann meteorologist noted that the moisture associated with the new system was tropical in nature, and warned of heavy rains. A yellow warning was issued by the Met Office on October 31 for most of Wales, except Anglesey and Monmouthshire. Parts of England also received yellow warnings. High wind gusts of 83 mph (134 km/h) were recorded in Plymouth, and another gust of 82 mph (132 km/h) was recorded in Culdrose. A total of 265 flights were delayed at London's Heathrow Airport, and thousands of people were affected by power outages in Cornwall and North Devon. The new storm also affected France with a wind gust of 101 mph (163 km/h).

== See also ==
- Tropical cyclones in 2019
- List of Azores hurricanes
- Tropical cyclone records
- Tropical Storm Christine (1973) – easternmost forming tropical cyclone in the Atlantic on record
- Tropical Storm Grace (2009) – took a similar track to Pablo
- Hurricane Alex (2016) – a rare Category 1 hurricane in January that affected similar areas
