= Hurricane Alex (2016) =

Category 1 Atlantic hurricane

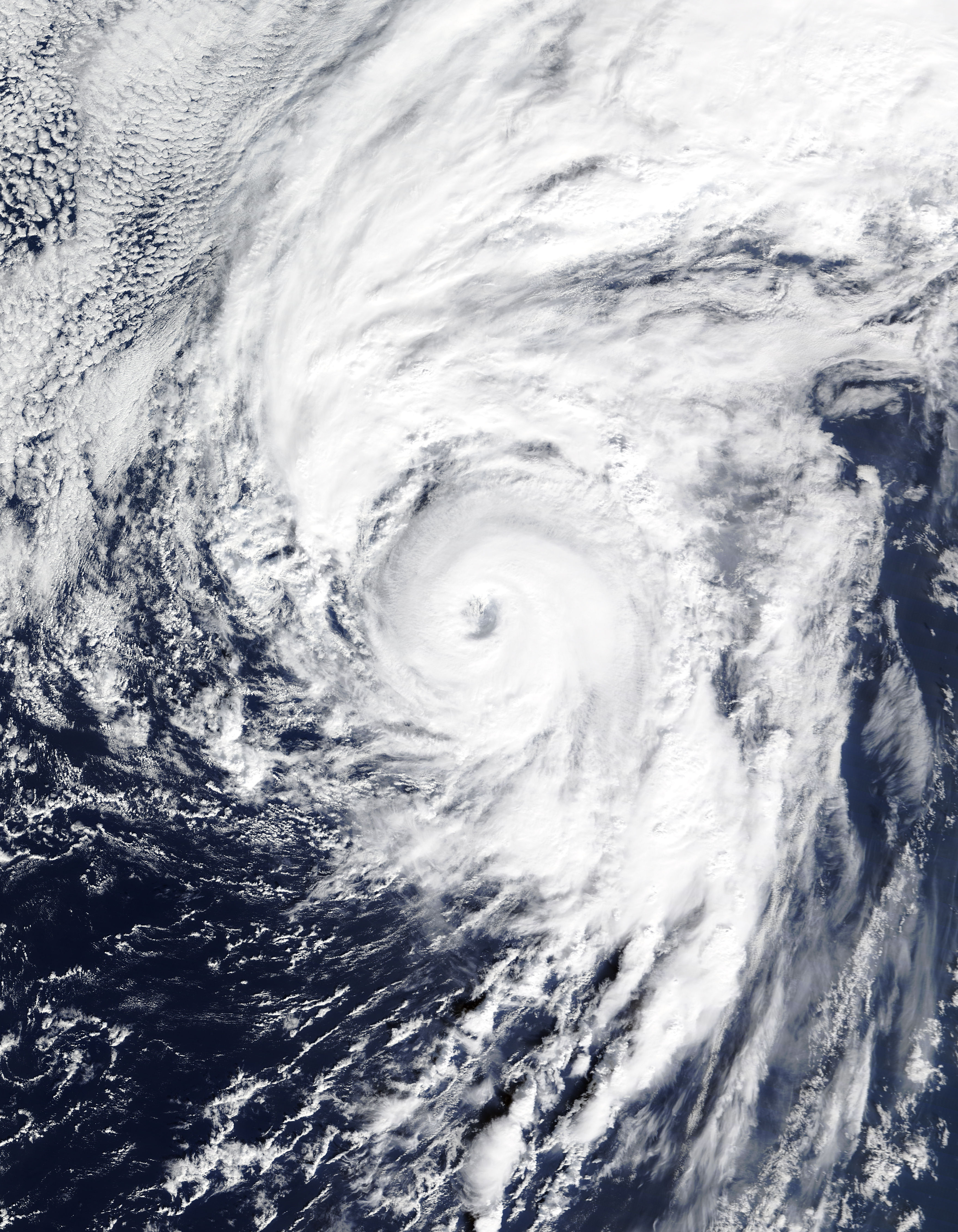
- Alex at peak intensity, south of the Azores, on January 14

Meteorological history
- Formed: January 12, 2016
- Extratropical: January 15, 2016
- Dissipated: January 17, 2016

Category 1 hurricane
- 1-minute sustained (SSHWS/NWS)
- Highest winds: 85 mph (140 km/h)
- Lowest pressure: 981 mbar (hPa); 28.97 inHg (978 mbar (28.88 inHg) while extratropical)

Overall effects
- Fatalities: 1 indirect
- Damage: Minimal
- Areas affected: The Bahamas; Bermuda; Azores; Greenland
- IBTrACS
- Part of the 2016 Atlantic hurricane season

Hurricane Alex was the first Atlantic hurricane to occur in January since Hurricane Alice of 1954–55. Alex originated as a non-tropical low near the Bahamas on January 7, 2016. Initially traveling northeast, the system passed by Bermuda on January 8 before turning southeast and deepening. It briefly acquired hurricane-force winds by January 10, then weakened slightly before curving towards the east and later northeast. Acquiring more tropical weather characteristics over time, the system transitioned into a subtropical cyclone well south of the Azores on January 12, becoming the first North Atlantic tropical or subtropical cyclone in January since Tropical Storm Zeta of 2005–2006. Alex continued to develop tropical features while turning north-northeast, and transitioned into a fully tropical cyclone on January 14. The cyclone peaked in strength as a Category 1 hurricane on the Saffir–Simpson scale (SSHWS), with maximum sustained winds of 85 mph (140 km/h) and a central pressure of 981 mbar (hPa; 28.97 inHg). Alex weakened to a high-end tropical storm before making landfall on Terceira Island on January 15. By that time, the storm was losing its tropical characteristics; it fully transitioned back into a non-tropical cyclone several hours after moving away from the Azores. Alex ultimately merged with another cyclone over the Labrador Sea on January 17.

The precursor cyclone to Hurricane Alex brought stormy conditions to Bermuda from January 7 to 9. On its approach, the hurricane prompted hurricane and tropical storm warnings and the closure of schools and businesses for the Azores. Alex brought gusty winds and heavy rain to the archipelago, though structural damage was generally minor. One person died of a heart attack because the inclement weather prevented them from being transported to hospital in time.

== Meteorological history ==
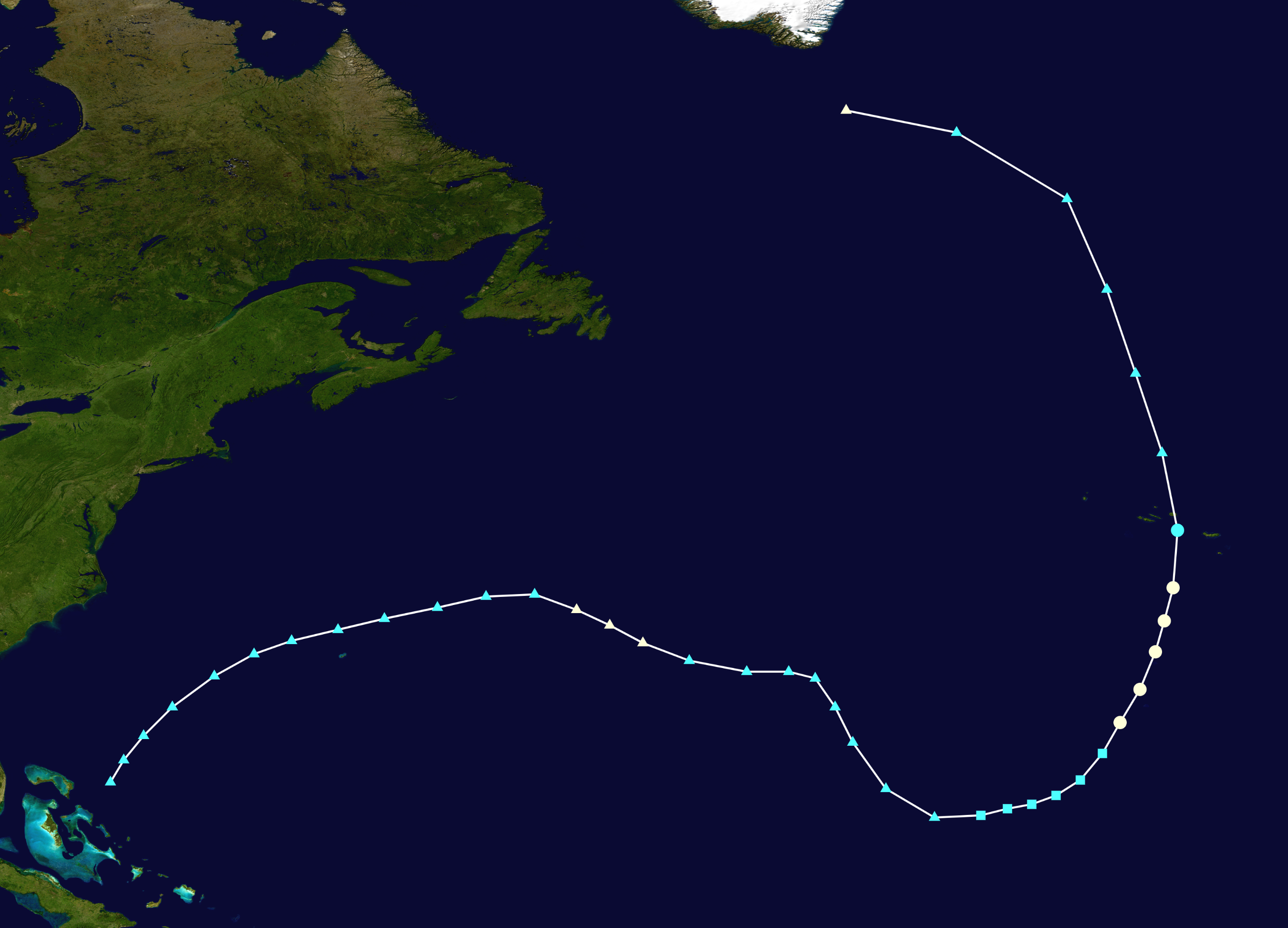
Map plotting the storm's track and intensity, according to the Saffir–Simpson scale Map key Saffir–Simpson scale Tropical depression (≤38 mph, ≤62 km/h) Tropical storm (39–73 mph, 63–118 km/h) Category 1 (74–95 mph, 119–153 km/h) Category 2 (96–110 mph, 154–177 km/h) Category 3 (111–129 mph, 178–208 km/h) Category 4 (130–156 mph, 209–251 km/h) Category 5 (≥157 mph, ≥252 km/h) Unknown Storm type Tropical cyclone Subtropical cyclone Extratropical cyclone, remnant low, tropical disturbance, or monsoon depression

In early January 2016, a stationary front spanned across the western Caribbean, spawning a non-tropical low along its boundary over northwestern Cuba by January 6. The low moved northeast ahead of the subtropical jet stream the following day, when its interaction with a shortwave trough produced a cyclonic disturbance at the lower atmospheric levels northeast of the Bahamas. This system proceeded northeast toward Bermuda, where unfavorable atmospheric conditions such as strong wind shear, low sea surface temperatures, and dry air initially inhibited tropical or subtropical cyclone formation. The system featured a large field of gale-force winds, with maximum sustained winds of 60–65 mph (95–100 km/h). On January 8, it passed about 75 mi (120 km) north of Bermuda, bringing strong winds and heavy rain to the islands. The next day, an unseasonable air pattern blocked the disturbance from continuing along its northeasterly path. Instead, the system turned east-southeast into a region slightly more favorable for subtropical development. On January 10, surface pressures below the system's core deepened to 979 mbar (hPa; 28.91 inHg) as the surrounding winds reached hurricane-force. Concurrently, a warm-core seclusion at the upper-levels marked the transition to a more symmetric structure, although convective activity near the center remained sparse. Once separated from the jet stream, the cyclone turned sharply to the south-southeast in response to a mid-latitude trough over the central Atlantic, entering a region with warmer waters of 2.7 °F (1.5 °C) above average for January.

The system underwent substantial changes to its cyclonic structure on January 11–12: frontal boundaries separated from the core of the cyclone, its core became symmetric, it became co-located with an upper-level low, (Note: Co-location with upper-level lows provides subtropical cyclones with the energy to fuel convection.) and intense albeit shallow convection developed atop the circulation. (Note: During winter months, the tropopause lowers in altitude because of the reduced convective activity at higher latitudes. This in turn limits the height of convection that does develop in association with weather systems. During summer months, regular development of thunderstorms pushes this boundary farther up.) All these factors indicated the storm's transition into a subtropical cyclone by 18:00 UTC on January 12, at which point it was situated 1,150 mi (1,850 km) west-southwest of the Canary Islands and received the name Alex from the National Hurricane Center. The cyclone proceeded to the east-northeast and eventually north-northeast over the next day, steered by the same trough that had enabled the previous southward turn.

An eye feature soon appeared at the center of the cyclone's spiral bands, marking intensification. The 20 mi-wide (25 km) feature cleared out early on January 14 and was surrounded by a largely symmetric ring of −75 °F (−60 °C) cloud tops. Alex then began to move away from the upper-level low it had been situated under and entered a region of lower wind shear, allowing the cyclone to acquire a deeper warm core with upper-level outflow typical of more tropical systems. Despite moving over 72 °F (22 °C) waters, (Note: Typically, sea surface temperatures of at least 80 °F (26.5 °C) are required to provide sufficient energy to fuel thunderstorm development within tropical cyclones. However, analyses of sea surface temperatures and tropical cyclones indicate little to no correlation between this value and tropical cyclogenesis. Other atmospheric factors, as shown in the case of Alex, are the dominant force in the development of tropical cyclones, especially ones of non-tropical origins in the mid-latitudes.) Alex continued to deepen and became a fully tropical cyclone by 06:00 UTC on January 14 – a transition supported by greater instability than usual for tropical cyclones due to colder upper-tropospheric temperatures than those around the equator. Upon the storm's transition, Dvorak satellite estimates indicated that Alex had achieved hurricane strength. The hurricane achieved its peak intensity as a tropical cyclone with winds of 85 mph (140 km/h) and a minimum barometric pressure of 981 mbar (hPa; 28.97 inHg) soon thereafter, classifying as a Category 1 on the Saffir–Simpson scale.

As Alex moved north toward the Azores, decreasing sea surface temperatures and increasing wind shear caused the cyclone to weaken through January 14 and 15. A deterioration of the convection around the hurricane's eye feature marked the start of its transition back to an extratropical cyclone. Becoming increasingly disorganized due to shear, Alex weakened to a tropical storm before making landfall over Terceira Island at 13:15 UTC with winds of 65 mph (100 km/h). Less than five hours later, the system completed its transition into an extratropical cyclone, featuring a more elongated circulation, an expanding radius of maximum winds, and frontal boundaries. Furthermore, the overall structure became more "comma-shaped" as a consequence of the frontal systems. The system deepened slightly to 978 mbar (hPa; 28.88 inHg) as it turned northwest towards Greenland. On its passage, the cyclone interacted with the mountainous southeastern coast of the island, generating hurricane-force winds over that region. Around 06:00 UTC on January 17, the remnants of Alex were absorbed into a larger extratropical low over the North Atlantic.

Structural evolution of Hurricane Alex from a non-tropical low into a hurricane
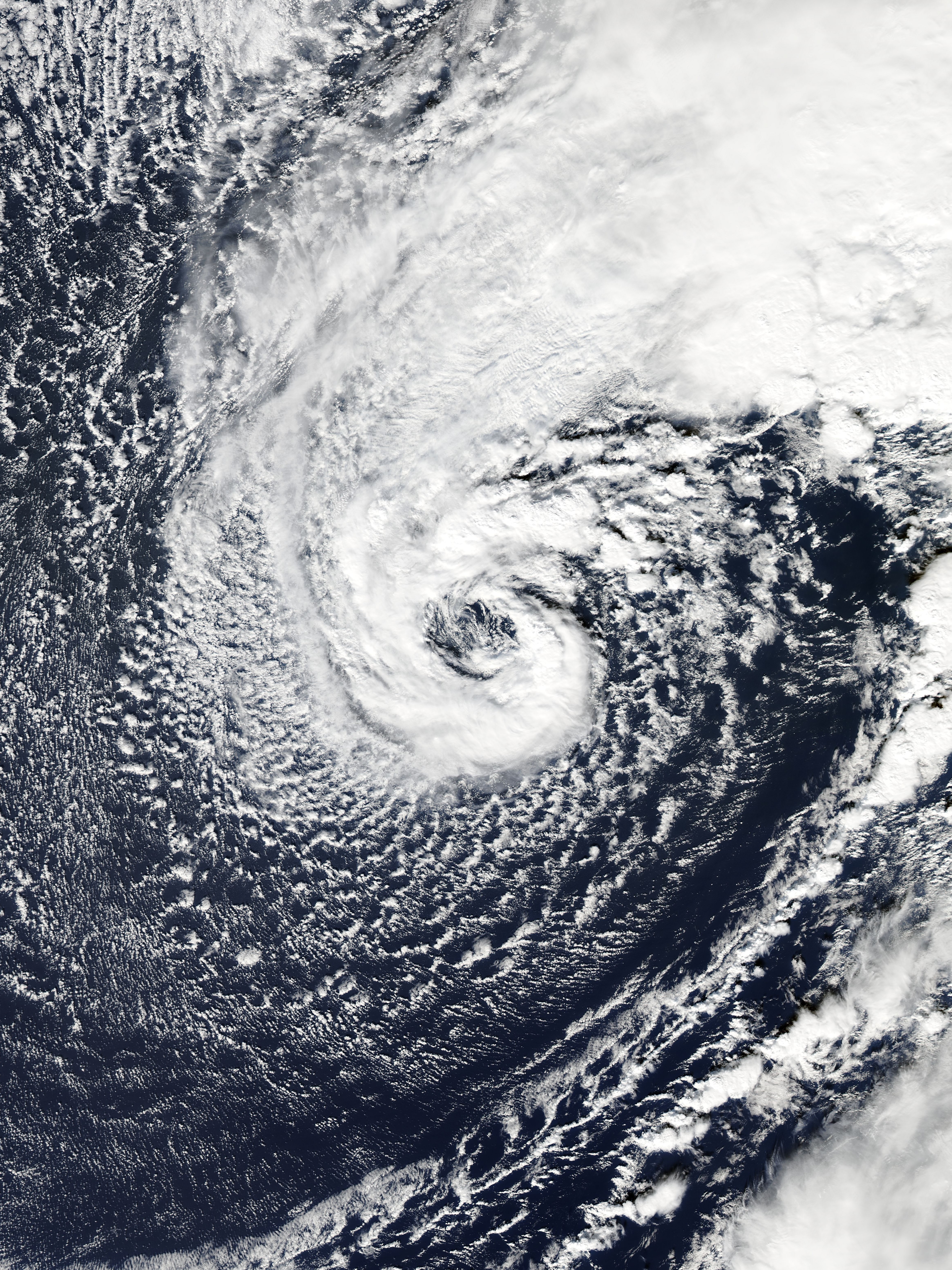
The precursor non-tropical cyclone on January 10. Note the eye-like feature caused by a Warm Seclusion.

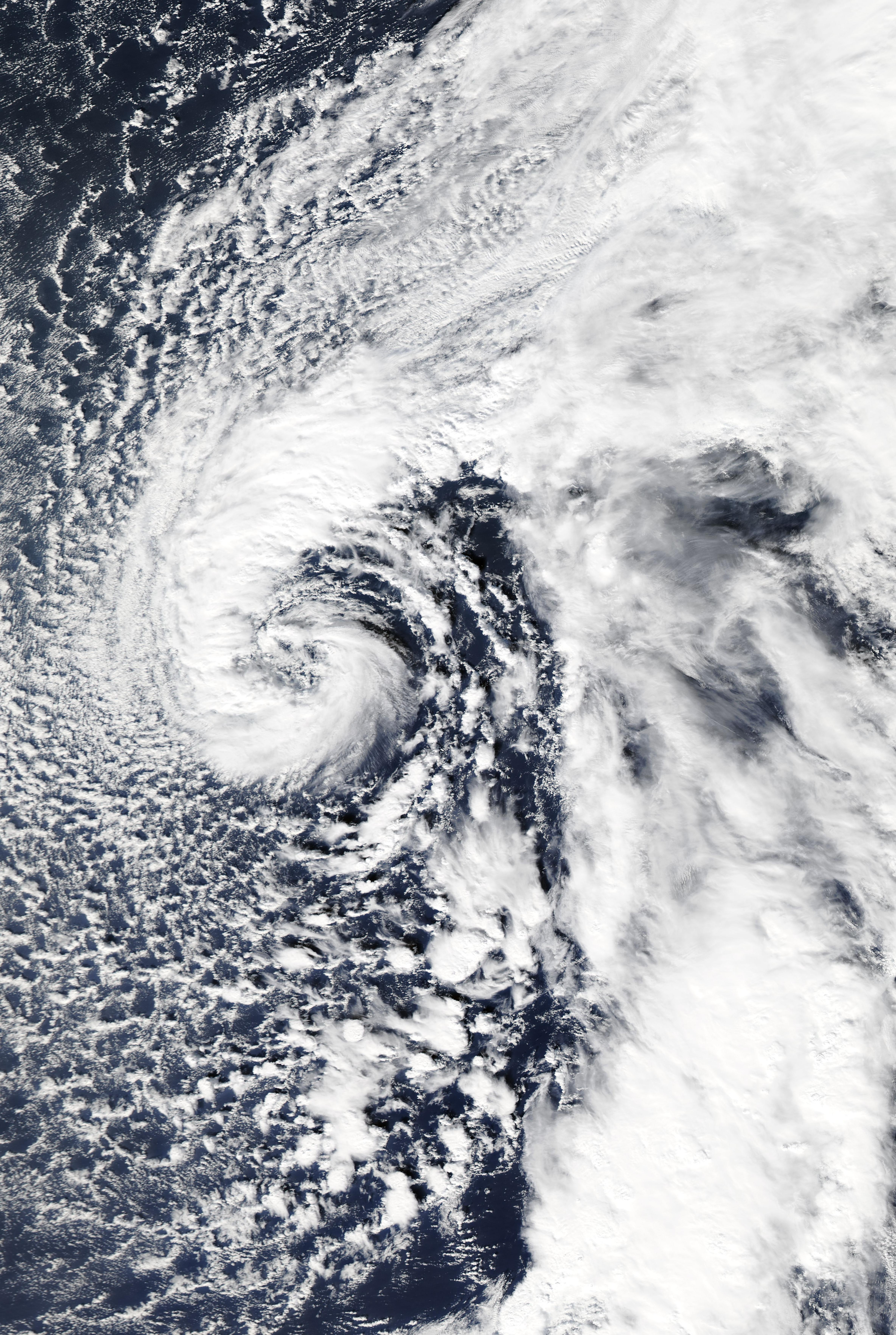
The cyclone becomes increasingly separated from frontal boundaries on January 11

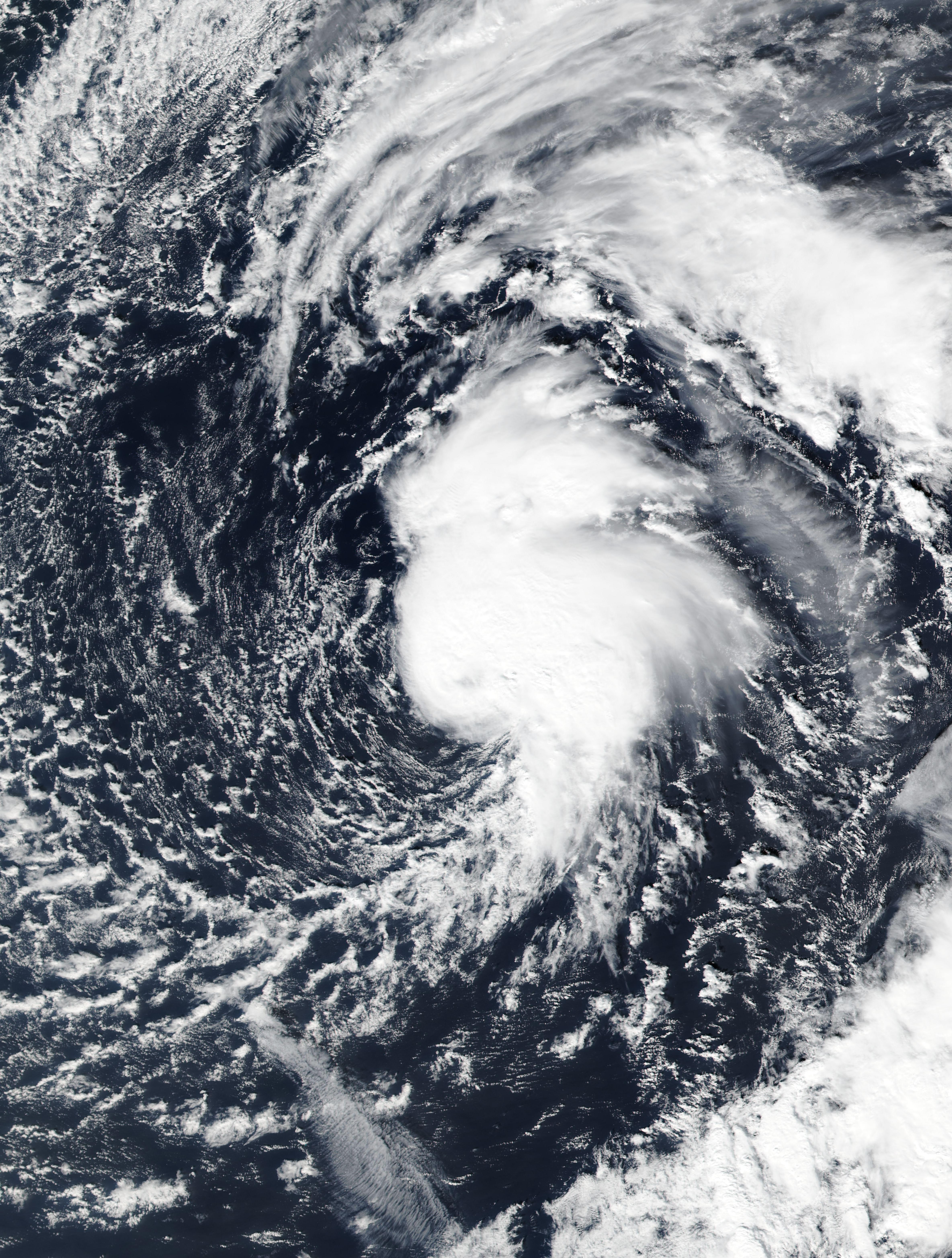
Convection develops atop the circulation center on January 12, signifying its transition into a subtropical cyclone

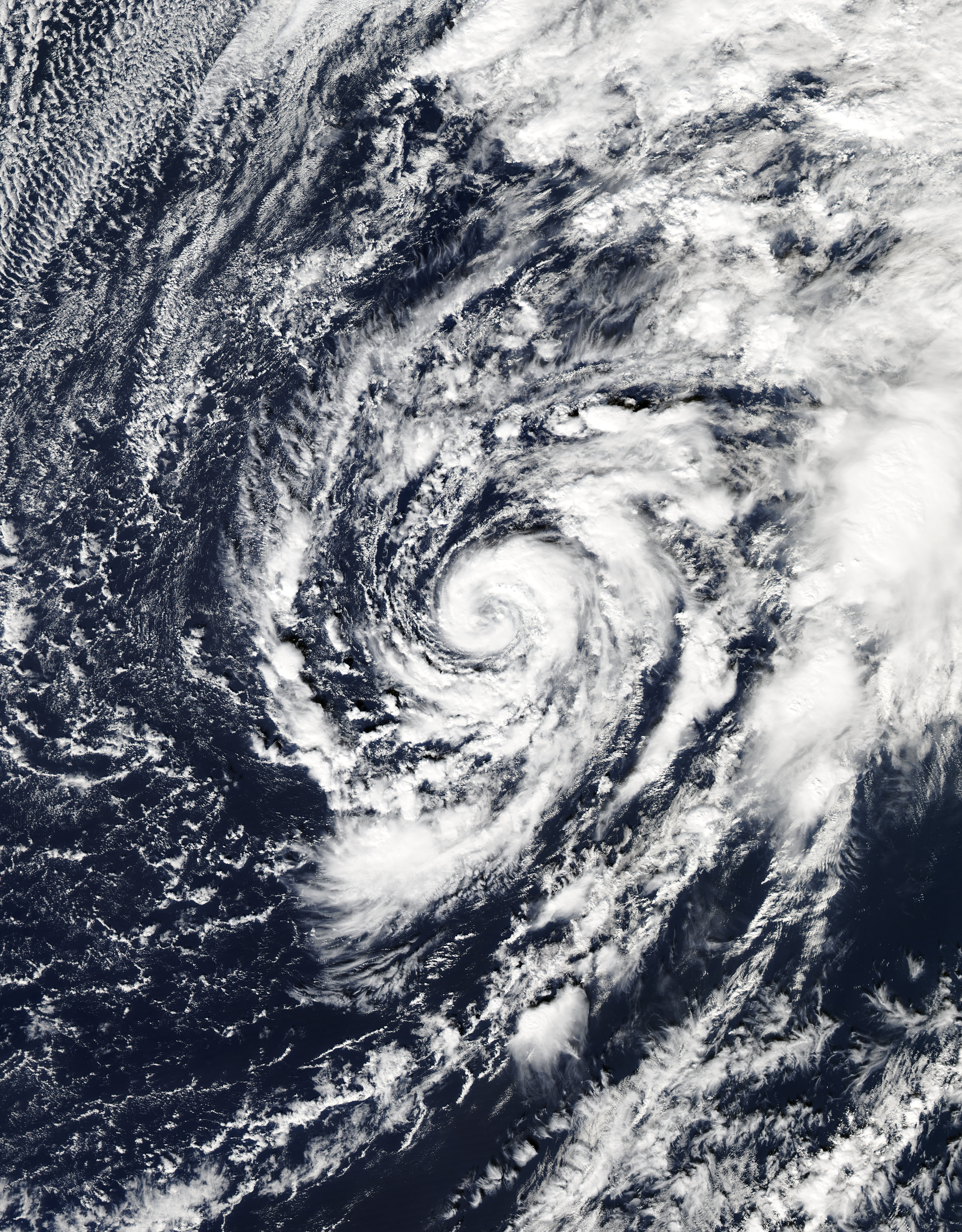
Banding features become increasingly defined on January 13 as Alex begins transitioning into a tropical cyclone

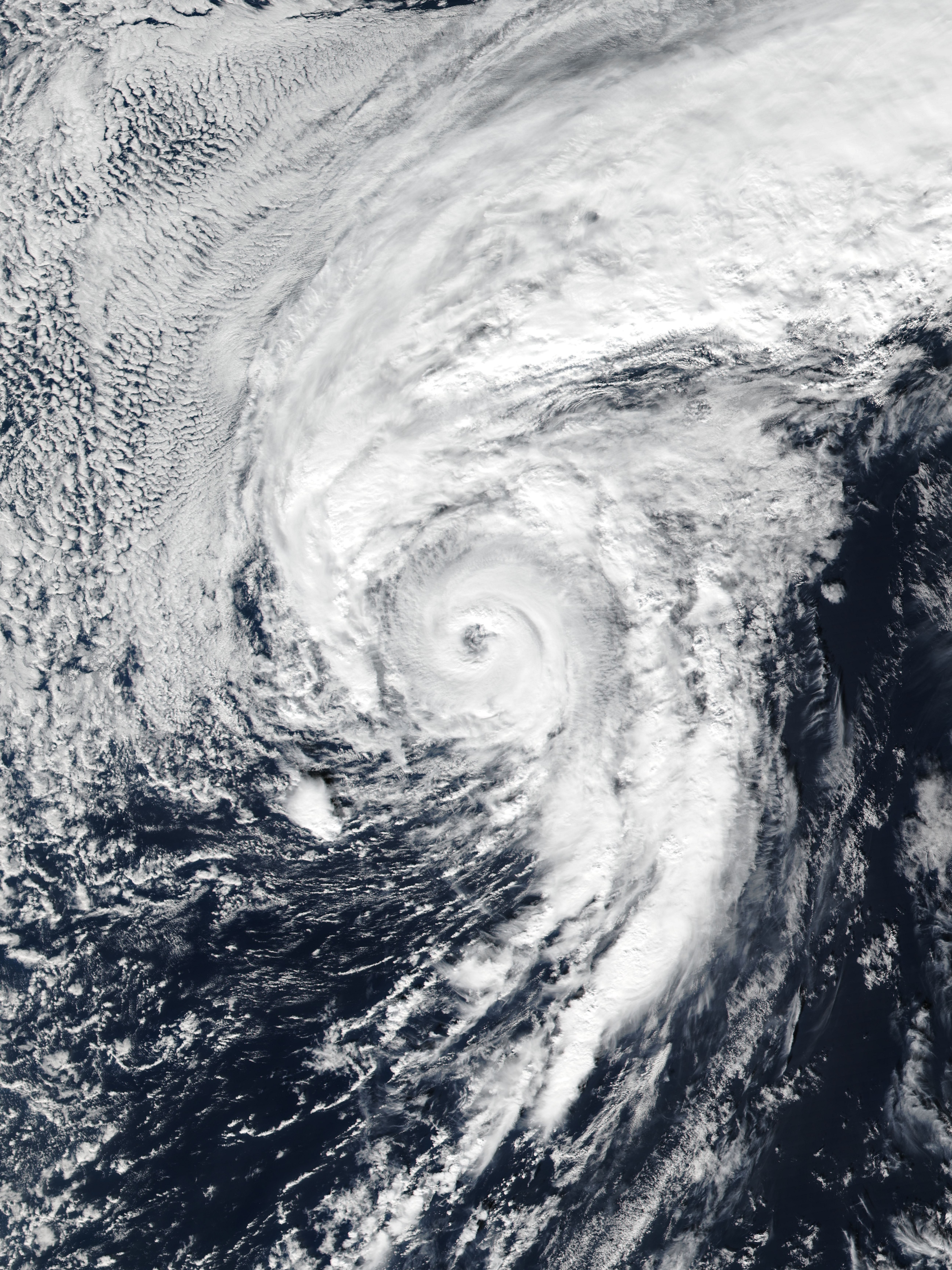
Alex develops a well-defined eye and core structure – the hallmarks of a hurricane – on January 14

== Preparations and impact ==
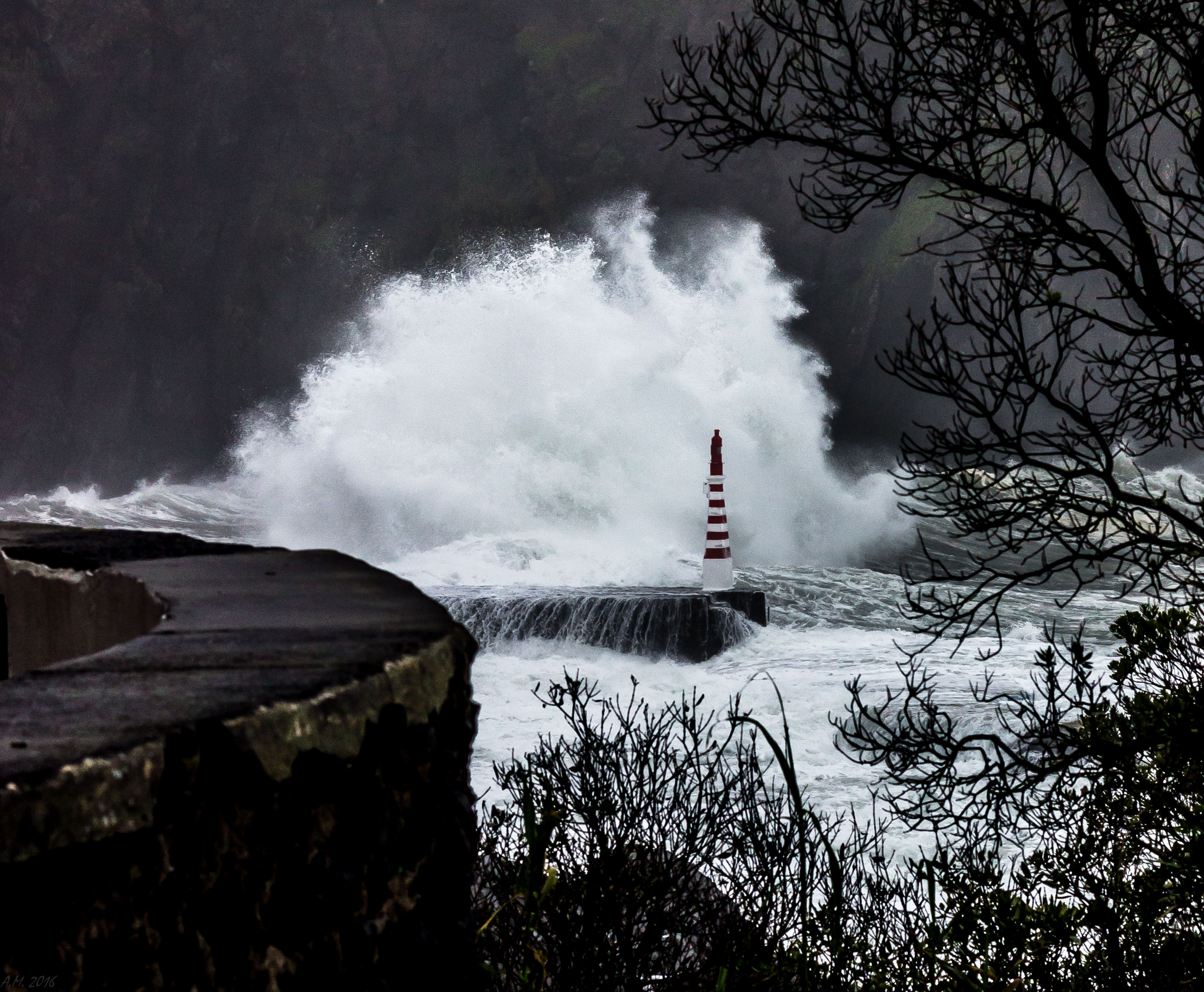
Rough surf from Hurricane Alex on São Miguel Island, in the Azores

=== Bermuda ===
The precursor to Alex brought stormy conditions to Bermuda between January 7 and 9, dropping 1.33 in (34 mm) of rain at Bermuda International Airport over the course of these three days. Gusts to 60 mph (97 km/h) disrupted air travel, downed trees, and left 753 customers without power on January 8. Waves as high as 20 ft (6 m) prompted small craft advisories and the suspension of ferry services between the islands.

=== Azores ===
When Alex was classified as a hurricane on January 14, the Azores Meteorological Service issued a hurricane warning for the islands of Faial, Pico, São Jorge, Graciosa, and Terceira, and a tropical storm warning for São Miguel and Santa Maria. A red alert – the highest level of weather warnings – was declared for central and eastern islands. Anticipating strong winds and heavy rain, homeowners stacked sandbags to protect their properties from flooding and boarded up doors and windows. Officials closed schools and administrative buildings for the duration of the storm. SATA Air Açores cancelled 33 domestic and international flights for the morning of January 15, stranding more than 700 passengers. The hurricane and tropical storm warnings were discontinued on January 15 after Alex had passed.

Traversing the archipelago on January 15, Alex brought heavy rain and gusty winds to several islands. Rainfall totaled 4.04 in (103 mm) in Lagoa, São Miguel, and 3.71 in (94 mm) in Angra do Heroísmo, Terceira. Wind gusts exceeded 50 mph (80 km/h) on Santa Maria Island and peaked at 57 mph (92 km/h) in Ponta Delgada, São Miguel. The strong winds brought down trees, damaged some roofs, and triggered scattered power outages. The storm caused minor flooding; six homes in Ponta Delgada sustained damage, while the winds destroyed the roof of another. Landslides occurred across the central islands, though their damage was limited. Overall, the storm's effects were milder than initially feared, possibly because the strongest winds were located far from the center of Alex as the system underwent an extratropical transition. One person suffering a heart attack died as an indirect result of Alex when turbulence from the storm hindered their emergency helicopter from taking off in time.

== Distinctions ==
Alex was only the sixth January tropical or subtropical cyclone on record, and only the third hurricane in January, along with an unnamed hurricane in 1938 and Hurricane Alice in 1955. Alex's landfall on Terceira as a strong tropical storm marked only the second such occurrence for an Atlantic tropical cyclone in January, after Hurricane Alice, which made landfall on the islands of Saint Martin and Saba. Alex was also only the second hurricane on record to form north of 30°N and east of 30°W.

The January 2016 formation of Hurricane Pali several thousand miles away in the Central Pacific coincided with Alex's. This marked the first recorded occurrence of simultaneous January tropical cyclones between these two basins.

== See also ==
- Other storms of the same name
- List of off-season Atlantic hurricanes
- Timeline of the 2016 Atlantic hurricane season
- List of Bermuda hurricanes
- List of Azores hurricanes
- Hurricane Ophelia (2017) – A Category 3 hurricane that attained that intensity farther east than any other storm on record
