= List of Azores hurricanes =

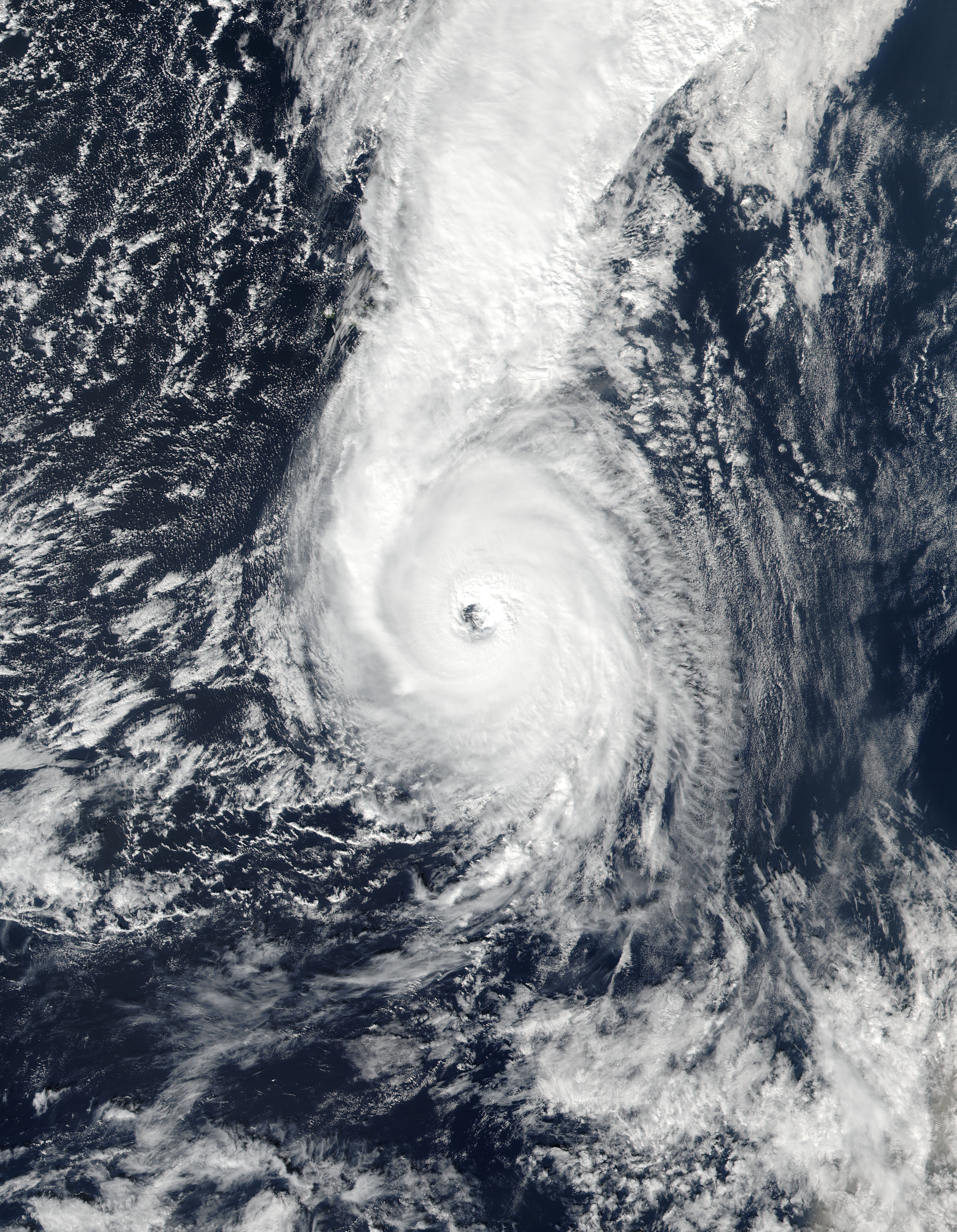
Satellite image of Hurricane Ophelia located south of the Azores

The Azores, an autonomous region of Portugal in the northeastern Atlantic Ocean, has experienced the effects of at least 21 Atlantic hurricanes, or storms that were once tropical or subtropical cyclones. The most recent storm to affect the archipelago was Tropical Storm Patty, while still subtropical, in 2024.

== Climatology and background ==
Tropical cyclones affect the Azores once every few years. Due to the island's location and the cool sea surface temperatures, tropical cyclones usually weaken upon their approach to the islands.

== 1990s ==
- August 4–9, 1990 – Tropical Storm Edouard passed near the islands.
- September 11, 1991 – Tropical Storm Erika struck São Miguel Island with wind gusts of up to 67 mph (108 km/h).
- September 27, 1992 – Tropical Storm Charley struck Terceira Island, producing wind gusts of 82 mph (132 km/h) at Lajes Field.
- September 30, 1992 – Just days after the previous storm, Tropical Storm Bonnie moved through the central Azores. Wind gusts reached 59 mph (95 km/h) at Lajes Field. One man was killed by a rock fall on São Miguel.
- November 1, 1995 – Tropical Storm Tanya transitioned into an extratropical storm before moving through the Azores. The storm produced wind gusts of 105 mph (169 km/h). Tanya knocked down trees and power lines, sank several boats, and damaged houses. A fisherman drowned amid high waves in the archipelago.
- September 15, 1997 – Tropical Storm Erika brushed the western Azores, producing wind gusts of 105 mph (169 km/h) on a 200 ft (61 m) tower at Lajes. The storm dropped up to 2.35 inches (60 mm) of rain in Flores, where gusts reached 87 mph (140 km/h).
- September 30, 1998 – Tropical Storm Jeanne transitioned into an extratropical cyclone while approaching the Azores. It produced wind gusts of 40 mph (64 km/h) on Horta Island.

== 2000s ==
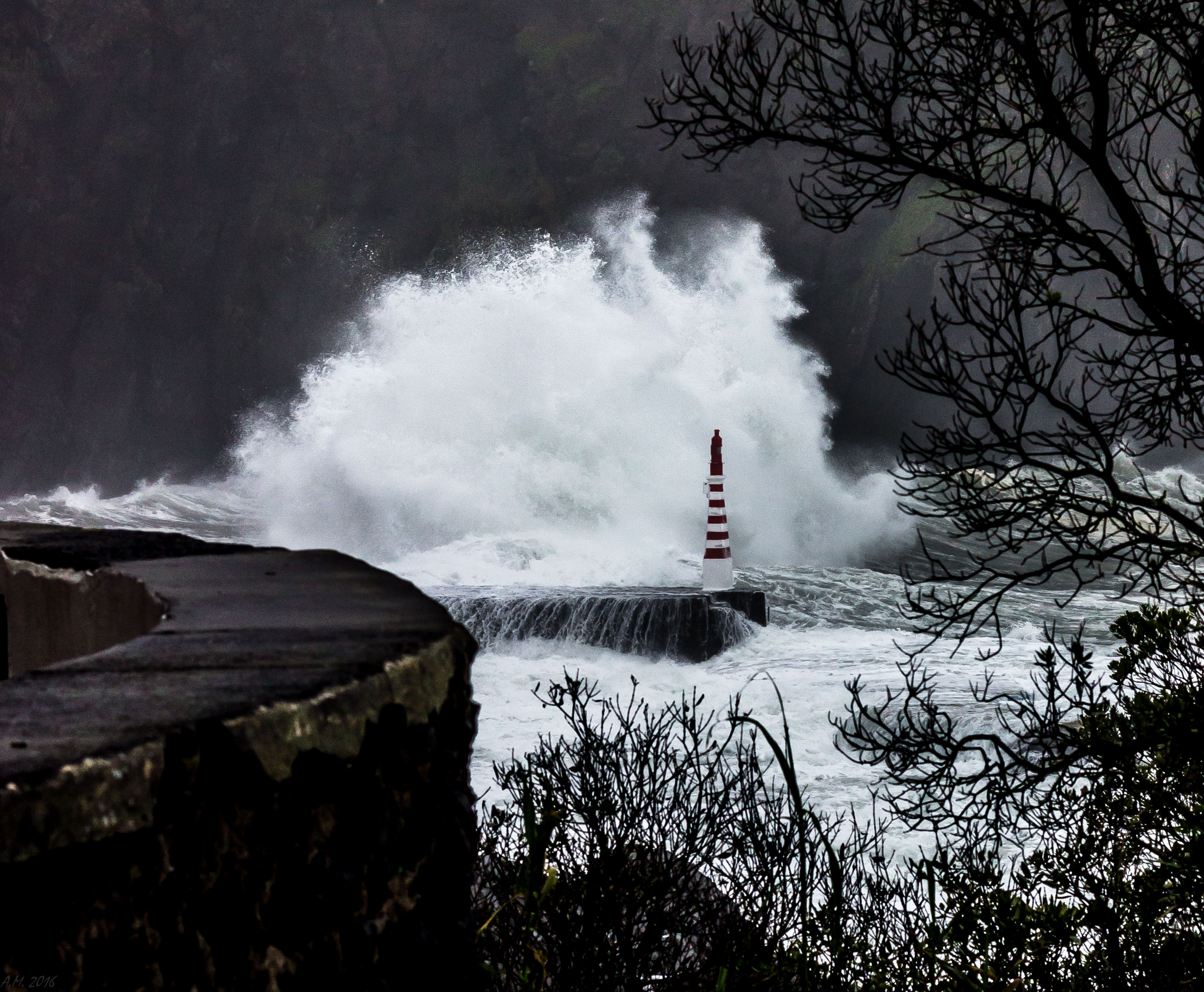
Rough surf from Hurricane Alex on São Miguel Island, in the Azores

- April 27, 2003 – an extratropical cyclone, formerly Tropical Storm Ana, passed south of the Azores, producing 0.87 inches (22 mm) of rainfall at Ponta Delgada.
- October 4, 2005 – a subtropical storm moved through the eastern Azores, producing wind gusts of 59 mph (95 km/h) on Santa Maria Island.
- September 20, 2006 – Hurricane Gordon passed through the Azores between the islands of Santa Maria and São Miguel; a station on the former island recorded sustained winds of 56 mph (90 km/h), with gusts to 82 mph (132 km/h). Overall impact was limited to toppled trees and power lines, leaving portions of Santa Maria Island without electrical service.
- October 4, 2009 – an extratropical cyclone transitioned into Tropical Storm Grace near São Miguel Island, producing wind gusts of 44 mph (71 km/h) at Ponta Delgada on São Miguel.

== 2010s ==
- August 20, 2012 – Hurricane Gordon made landfall on Santa Maria Island with winds of 75 mph (121 km/h). Gordon produced wind gusts of 81 mph (130 km/h) on the island, and triggered a few landslides. The winds knocked down trees, damaged windows, and briefly cut power. Waves 21 ft (6.4 m) in height caused flooding along the coast.
- September 21, 2012 – Tropical Storm Nadine transitioned into an extratropical cyclone as it approached within 260 mi (420 km) southwest of the Azores. The storm producing wind gusts of 81 mph (130 km/h) on Faial Island. Nadine turned southeast away from the archipelago, and spent the next 13 days moving across the eastern Atlantic Ocean. Nadine again transitioned into an extratropical cyclone on October 4, and later that day moved through the central Azores, producing wind gusts of 87 mph (140 km/h) at the Wind Power Plant on Santa Maria.
- December 7, 2013 – A subtropical storm approached the western Azores and degenerated into a trough. The storm produced gusts to 54 mph (87 km/h) on Santa Maria Island.
- January 14–15, 2016 – Hurricane Alex made landfall on Terceira Island as a tropical storm, hours after weakening below hurricane status. Rainfall totaled 4.04 in (103 mm) in Lagoa, São Miguel. Wind gusts reached 57 mph (92 km/h) in Ponta Delgada. One person suffering a heart attack died as an indirect result of Alex when turbulence from the storm hindered their emergency helicopter from taking off in time. Alex triggered a few landslides, and damaged homes from its winds.
- September 2, 2016 – Hurricane Gaston transitioned into an extratropical cyclone near the Azores, producing wind gusts of 52 mph (84 km/h) on Flores and Faial islands.
- October 14, 2017 – Hurricane Ophelia passed south of the Azores as the easternmost major hurricane on record. The hurricane produced wind gusts of 44 mph (71 km/h) on São Miguel.
- September 15, 2018 – Tropical Storm Helene passed west of the Azores, where it was estimated to have produced tropical storm force winds.
- October 2, 2019 – Hurricane Lorenzo passed near the western Azores, producing wind gusts of 101 mph (163 km/h) on Corvo Island. At the Port of Lajes das Flores port building and some cargo containers were swept away, while the dock itself was partially damaged. Total damage across the island chain were around €330 million (US$362 million).
- October 27, 2019 – Tropical Storm Pablo passed just to the southeast of the Azores as it was intensifying, bringing gusty winds as high as 55 mph (89 km/h) in some places and large waves to the islands.
- October 31, 2019 – Subtropical Storm Rebekah passed to the north of The Azores as it was dissipating, bringing only negligible effects.
- November 25, 2019 – Tropical Storm Sebastien transitioned into an extratropical storm near the western Azores, bringing wind gusts of 55 mph (89 km/h) to Ponta Delgada.

== 2020s ==
- September 17–18, 2020 – The extratropical remnants of Hurricane Paulette moved over the islands.
- September 23–25, 2022 – Tropical Storm Gaston passed over the islands, bringing heavy rains and wind gusts of 41 mph (66 km/h).
- November 2–3, 2024 – Tropical Storm Patty traversed the islands as a subtropical cyclone.
- September 25–26, 2025 – The post-tropical remnants of Hurricane Gabrielle moved over the islands.

== Climatology ==
Storms affecting the Azores by month
| Month | Number of storms |
|---|---|
| January | 1 |
| April | 1 |
| September | 10 |
| October | 4 |
| November | 3 |
| December | 1 |

Storms affecting the Azores by period
| Period | Number of storms |
|---|---|
| 1990s | 5 |
| 2000s | 4 |
| 2010s | 11 |
| 2020s | 4 |

== Deadly storms ==
The following is a list of Atlantic tropical storms that caused fatalities in the Azores.

| Name | Year | Number of deaths |
|---|---|---|
| Bonnie | 1992 | 1 |
| Tanya | 1995 | 1 |
| Alex | 2016 | 1 |

== See also ==
- Lists of Atlantic hurricanes
- List of European tropical cyclones
